= List of YouTubers =

YouTubers are people mostly known for their work on the video sharing platform YouTube. The following is a list of YouTubers for whom Wikipedia has articles either under their own name or their YouTube channel name. This list excludes people who, despite having a YouTube presence, are primarily known for their work elsewhere.

== YouTube personalities ==
† Denotes the person that is deceased

User(s)	Country	Channel(s)	Notes
A
Richard Ackerman	United States	redeemedzoomer6053	American Presbyterian activist who makes videos on theology while playing Minecraft.
Derrick Acosta, Rocco Botte, Shawn Chatfield	United States	Mega64, Mega64Infinity, CringeLords64	American sketch comedy YouTubers
Armen Adamjan	Denmark	creative explained	Born in Armenia, makes videos on various lifehacks, mostly about plants and food.
Jidon Adams	United States	JiDion, JiDionPremium, JiDion Shorts	American internet personality who creates various types of content. Formerly did pranks and religious content.
Margaret Adams	United States, Japan	Magibon (formerly MRirian)	American YouTuber known as Magibon who went viral in Japan for her silent videos where she looks at the camera.
† Nasim Aghdam	Iran	Nasime Sabz, Yeşil Nasim	Vegan activist, PETA supporter, and aspiring fitness personality. Perpetrator and only fatality of the 2018 YouTube headquarters shooting.
Michael Agrusso	United States	ItsJustSomeRandomGuy	Creator of "Hi, I'm a Marvel...and I'm a DC" video series.
Lloyd Ahlquist	United States	EpicLLOYD, ERB	Rapper, comedy theater, songwriter, co-founder of the web series Epic Rap Battles of History.
Safwan Ahmedmia	United Kingdom	SuperSaf TV	Technology reviews.
Ahmed El-Ghandour	Egypt	Da7ee7	Popular science YouTuber.
Alastair Aiken	United Kingdom	Ali-A, MoreAliA, Ali-A Plays	Aiken's channels upload gaming videos as well as vlogs. He is best known for his Call of Duty gameplay videos.
Jackie Aina	United States	lilpumpkinpie05	Beauty and fashion vlogger.
Alex Aiono	United States	Alex Aiono	Singer, producer and actor.
Akai Haato	Japan	HAACHAMA Ch 赤井はあと	VTuber associated with Hololive Production.
Anna Akana	United States	Anna Akana	Filmmaker, producer, actress, and comedian known for her short films and sketches.
Naser Al Azzeh and Vineeth ′Beep′ Kumar	India	Jordindian	Indian comedy sketch duo.
Simone Albrigi	Italy	Scottecs, Sio, Sio FromItaly	Italian cartoonist and YouTuber.
Mirko Alessandrini	Italy	CiccioGamer89, CiccioGamer2	YouTuber known for gaming and cooking videos.
† Alexander	United States	Technoblade	American Minecraft player and livestreamer. Died in June 2022 from metastatic sarcoma.
Alexis Alford	United States	Lexie Limitless	Adventure traveler, photographer, and blogger best known for traveling to 196 countries before the age of twenty-one and holds the Guinness World Record for being the youngest person to visit all of them.
Abdullah Alghafis	Saudi Arabia	Agafes	Technology YouTuber.
Baba Ali	United States	ummahfilms	Comedy YouTuber.
LaToya Ali	Canada	latoyaforever	YouTuber best known for vlogs.
Rucka Rucka Ali	United States	Wheres Rucka, itsRucka, RuckaWHO, RuckaWHAT, Ruckas Black	Parodist and rapper known for controversial and edgy songs.
Muhammad Ali Mirza	Pakistan	Engineer Muhammad Ali Mirza - Official Channel	Cleric that makes videos on Islam-related topics.
Nadir Ali	Pakistan	P 4 Pakao, Nadir Ali	Known for pranks, comedy and vlogging.
Livingston Allen	Jamaica, United States	DJ Akademiks, King Akademiks, The War in Chiraq	Hip hop blogger and commentator.
Karen Alloy	United States	Spricket24	Comedian.
Tiffany Alvord	United States	TiffanyAlvord	Singer-songwriter and cover artist.
Amane Kanata	Japan	Kanata Ch. Kanata Amane	Retired VTuber formerly associated with Hololive Production.
† Desmond Amofah	United States	EWNetwork (terminated), EtikaFRFX (terminated), TR1Iceman, E Live	Amofah, known online as "Etika", usually focused his YouTube channel around Nintendo games and streamed energetic reactions of himself to Nintendo Direct presentations. Amofah was reported missing by the NYPD on 20 June 2019. His body was discovered in the East River on June 24, after he killed himself by drowning.
Julia Anastasopoulos	South Africa	Suzelle DIY	South African actress, and artist.
Mark Angel	Nigeria	Mark Angel	Nigerian YouTuber, comedian and comedic actor.
Sweet Anita	United Kingdom	Sweet Anita, Sweet Anita's Best Clips	Gaming streamer and YouTuber noted for having Tourette syndrome.
Imane Anys	Canada	Pokimane, Poki ASMR	Streamer and YouTuber known for gaming content, vlogs, and podcasting.
Alex Apollonov	Australia	I Did a Thing, Boy Boy	Comedian and commentator, also known for engineering projects.
Maria Aragon	Canada	rojuanearagon	Singer that gained popularity for covering "Born This Way" and collaborating with Lady Gaga.
Araraura	—N/a	Daily Silksong News	News about Hollow Knight: Silksong
Humza Arshad	United Kingdom	HumzaProductions	Most notable for his web series Diary of a Bad Man and Badman.
Stuart Ashen	United Kingdom	ashens	British product reviewer, comedian, animator and actor.
Per Fredrik Åsly	Norway	pellekofficial, pellekofficial2	Actor and singer-songwriter known for metal song covers.
Chris Atkinson and Jeremy Scott	United States	CinemaSins, Music Video Sins, TVSins, Commercial Sins, CinemaSins Jeremy	Creators of the Everything Wrong With video series.
Roman Atwood	United States	RomanAtwood, RomanAtwoodVlogs	Comedian, prankster, and vlogger.
Austin	United States	Any Austin	Video essayist covering aspects of video game environmental design.
Sarah Austin	United States	pop17	Tech entrepreneur and author.
Dan Avidan	United States	Ninja Sex Party, GameGrumps	Singer-songwriter, comedian, and musician; co-host of Game Grumps, co-creator of musical comedy duo Ninja Sex Party, and member of musical comedy group Starbomb.
Brian Awadis	United States	FaZe Rug, FaZe Rug Games, FaZe Rug Shorts	Produces vlogs, challenges, gaming videos, and pranks. One of the co-owners of the FaZe Clan.
B
Andrew Byron Bachelor	Canada, United States	Bach Vlogs, BachelorsPadTV	Comedian that was the most followed user on Vine. Posts skits on Instagram, TikTok and YouTube as King Bach.
Huang Yixin and Wei Wei	China	Back Dorm Boys	Chinese duo Huang Yixin and Wei Wei, known for lip-syncing American pop songs.
† Mel Baggs	United States	silentmiaow	Most known for blogs and YouTube videos about autism.
Adam Bahner	United States	TayZonday, tayvox	Better known by the pseudonym Tay Zonday, or as "Chocolate Rain Guy", as he is most notable for his "Chocolate Rain" video.
† John Bain	United Kingdom	TotalBiscuit, TotalHalibut	Video game commentator and critic, died in 2018 from bowel cancer.
Bartholomew Baker	United States	Bart Baker, BART, Lil Kloroxxx	Best known for making parody videos of notable songs.
John Alfonza Baker Jr.	United States	SpokenReasons, SpokenReasonsTV	Comedian, actor, known for his role in The Heat and partnership with Russell Simmons's All Def Digital.
Colleen Ballinger	United States	Colleen Ballinger, Colleen Vlogs, Miranda Sings	Comedy vlogger as herself and as Miranda Sings; performs one-woman live comedy shows; created and stars in Haters Back Off on Netflix.
Bhuvan Bam	India	BB Ki Vines	Viner, composer and actor.
Jack Baran	United States	thatsojack	Vlogger from Connecticut.
Paul Barbato	United States	Geography Now	Educational channel, profiling every country in the world in alphabetical order as well as covering other topics regarding physical or political geography.
Vikram Singh Barn	United Kingdom	Vikkstar123, Vikkstar123HD, VikkstarPlays	English gaming YouTuber and internet personality who plays Call of Duty and Minecraft. Co-founding member of the YouTube group Sidemen.
Nathan Barnatt	United States	Nathan, Man, Dad, Keith Apicary	Focuses on memes.
Clint Basinger	United States	Lazy Game Reviews (LGR)	Reviewer of retro computer hardware, software, oddware, "Tech Tales", and "Thrifts", mostly of IBM PC compatibles.
Enes Batur	Turkey	enesbatur	YouTuber and actor.
Julian Baumgartner	United States	Baumgartner Restoration	Art conservator and owner of Baumgartner Restoration. Credited by Mashable with popularizing art restoration videos on YouTube, and named as the most popular art conservator on the platform.
Evgeny Bazhenov	Russia	BadComedian	Film critic.
Herschel Beahm IV	United States	DrDisRespect	Video game streamer.
Adam Beales	United Kingdom	Adam B	Northern Irish actor and YouTuber.
Matt Beat	United States	Mr. Beat, The Beat Goes On	Educator and author.
Richard Beato	United States	Rick Beato	Music teacher, guitarist and record producer who also interviews notable persons in the music industry.
María Becerra	Argentina	Maria Becerra	Humour.
Eva Zu Beck	Poland	Eva Zu Beck	Travel vlogger, presenter, TV show host.
Noah Timothy Beck	United States	Noah Beck	TikToker and vlogger.
Alan Becker	United States	Alan Becker, AlanBeckerMinecraft, AlanBeckerTutorials	Known for his animation web videos like "Animation vs. Minecraft" and series like "Animator vs. Animation".
Jo Beckwith	United States	Footless Jo, Trauma Talk	Disability and mental health advocacy.
Loren Gray Beech	United States	Loren Gray, LorenGrayVEVO	Musical.ly creator turned vlogger and musician.
Matty Benedetto	United States	Unnecessary Inventions	Inventor and content creator known for creating and showcasing comedic "unnecessary inventions".
Carl Benjamin	United Kingdom	Sargon of Akkad, Akkad Daily	British vlogger; posts videos which concern a wide variety of subjects, varying from gaming, anti-ideology, history and fiction, and Gamergate and antifeminism.
Rich Benoit	United States	Rich Rebuilds	Known for rebuilding Teslas, among other cars.
Greg Benson	United States	MediocreFilms	Comedian, director, and producer. Known mostly for his work on the Retarded Policeman web series.
Virginia Benzi	Italy	Quantum Girl	Science, technology, engineering, and mathematics popularizer
Craig Benzine	United States	WheezyWaiter	Started vlogging about his job as a waiter, then quit his job to become a full YouTuber and video maker after he became a hit.
Joe Bereta and Luke Barats	United States	BaratsAndBereta	Creators of Barats and Bereta.
Joel Berghult	Sweden	RoomieOfficial	Known for music and music-related content.
† Byron Bernstein	United States	Reckful	Gaming content.
Timothy Betar	United States	TimTheTatman, TimTheTatman Two, More TimTheTatman	Counter-Strike: Global Offensive streamer.
Amit Bhadana	India	Amit Bhadana	Hindi-language comedy YouTuber.
Alex Bertie	United Kingdom	TheRealAlexBertie	Transgender vlogger and LGBT+ activist.
Davide Biale	Italy	Davie504	Italian bassist and comedian.
Justin Bieber	Canada	Justin Bieber	Canadian singer who was discovered on YouTube. 4th most subscribed YouTuber, with 42 million subscribers, with 18.7 billion views.
Maxim Bilovitskiy	Estonia	Thoisoi, Thoisoi2	Estonian YouTuber who makes chemistry videos in Russian and in English.
Joseph Birdsong	United States	Disneykid1, DK1games	Vlogger, gameplay blogger, and member of Candy Coded.
Joseph Bizinger	Japan	The Anime Man	Videos about anime, Japanese culture, language and gaming.
Rebecca Black	United States	rebecca	An American teen who became famous after posting her song "Friday" that received more than 127 million views, 3.3 million dislikes, and hugely negative comments dubbing the song the "worst song ever".
Emma Blackery	United Kingdom	EmmaBlackery	Vlogger, known for "My thoughts on Google+" video, and singer-songwriter.
Blaire	United States	QTCinderella, Wine About It	IRL streams.
Tim Blais	Canada	A Capella Science	A physicist, Blais communicates science topics via parodies of popular songs.
Kat Blaque	United States	Kat Blaque	Video blogger, activist known for True Tea.
Iwona Blecharczyk	Poland	Iwona Blecharczyk	Polish lorry driver, transportation enthusiast and YouTuber.
Richard Tyler Blevins	United States	Ninja, Ninja Extended	Twitch streamer/ESports gamer who translated his gaming onto YouTube. Known and recognized for his success in Fortnite.
Bob's Your Uncle	Hong Kong	煮家男人 Bob's Your Uncle	Cooking and travel YouTuber.
Dane Boedigheimer	United States	Dane Boe, Annoying Orange, Daneboe Channel No. 2, SuperBoeBros	Creator of Annoying Orange video series.
PANDA BOI	Italy	pandaboi.com	Most subscribed and viewed YouTube channel in Italy. Posts comedy short videos on Instagram, TikTok, YouTube, Facebook and Snapchat.
Steven Bonnell II	United States	Destiny	Twitch streamer and political commentator.
Flula Borg	Germany	flula	Vlogs (often based on misinterpretations of common figures of speech), covers of popular songs recorded in his car and other vehicles ("AutoTunes"), original music, celebrity interviews, and other humorous content.
John D. Boswell	United States	melodysheep	Musician and filmmaker, creator of Symphony of Science, Timelapse of the Entire Universe, Timelapse of the Future and The Secret History of the Moon.
Andrea Botez, Alexandra Botez	Canada, United States	BotezLive, BotezLive Clips, Alexandra Botez, Andrea Botez	Chess content.
Bachir Boumaaza	Belgium	AtheneWins	Video gamer and social activist who is widely referred to by his online pseudonym "Athene."
Jade Bowler	United Kingdom	Unjaded Jade	Educational "StudyTuber".
Joshua Bradley	United Kingdom	Zerkaa, ZerkaaPlays, ZerkaaClips, ZerkaaShorts	English gaming YouTuber, streamer and Internet personality; listed as the ninth most influential online creator in the United Kingdom by The Sunday Times. Co-founding member of the YouTube group Sidemen.
Nigel Braun	Canada	NileRed	Chemist who performs strange and often dangerous experiments.
Ysabella Brave	United States	ysabellabrave	A vocalist who was signed by Cordless Recordings.
Harry Brewis	United Kingdom	Hbomberguy	Left-wing YouTuber known for producing videos aimed at debunking conspiracy theories and responding to alt-right and antifeminist arguments.
Lewis Brindley and Simon Lane	United Kingdom	The Yogscast	Gaming videos, podcasts, streaming. Gained fame with Minecraft videos and songs. The annual Jingle Jam streaming event has raised over $20 million for charity since 2011.
Chris Broad	United Kingdom	Abroad in Japan, Chris Abroad	Known for making videos about Japanese culture, travel and food, as a British resident of the country.
Brooke Brodack	United States	Brooke Brodack	Actress, editor, director. Known for her "Crazed Numa Fan" and "Chips" videos.
Gary Brolsma	United States	NewNuma	Creator of the "Numa Numa" dance.
Nguyễn Thị Tân	Vietnam	Bà Tân Vlog	Vietnamese YouTuber known for cooking videos featuring large portions and simple, rustic recipes.
Fox Bronte	United Kingdom	MonaLisaNaked	Alternative artist known for his rants on modern day culture and putting himself in uncomfortable situations to make his artwork.
Josiah Brooks	Australia	DrawWithJazza	Art drawing tutorials.
Dan Brown	United States	pogobat, danbrownuniverse	Developer of the "Dan Brown Method" of solving a Rubik's Cube.
David Brown	United Kingdom	Boyinaband, DBGames (with artist Dan Bull)	YouTuber, musician, and rapper.
Mark Brown	United Kingdom	Game Maker's Toolkit	Video game analysis and video essays.
Tobit "Tobi" Brown	United Kingdom	TBJZL, TBJZLPlays, TBJZLClips	English gaming YouTuber, streamer, Internet personality and rapper; listed as the 38th most influential online creator in the United Kingdom by The Sunday Times. Co-founding member of the YouTube group Sidemen.
Jim Browning	United Kingdom	Jim Browning	Northern Irish scam baiter.
Marques Brownlee	United States	Marques Brownlee	Tech YouTuber.
Scott Buchanan	United States	pannenkoek2012	Super Mario 64 analyst.
Kéfera Buchmann	Brazil	5incominutos, keferavlog	Comedy videos and daily vlogs.
Michael Buckley	United States	WHATTHEBUCKSHOW, Michael Buckley, bucksphone	Known for his celebrity news show, What the Buck!?
Dan Bull	United Kingdom	Dan Bull, DBGames (With artist Boyinaband)	English rapper and songwriter who was known best for his songs about video games.
Vladislav Bumaga	Belarus	A4, A5	Music artist and video blogger.
Bo Burnham	United States	boburnham, mahnrubob	Comedian, comedic singer, musician, songwriter, and actor.
Tanya Burr	United Kingdom	pixi2woo, tanyasvlogsandhauls	Beauty, fashion and lifestyle vlogger. Also has her own cosmetic line Tanya Burr.
Tim Burton	United Kingdom	Shmee150	Car vlogger.
Judith Bustos	Peru	LaTigresaDelOrienteC	Peruvian singer and make-up artist whose YouTube exposure led to a contract with Warner Bros. Mexico.
Michael Bustos	Canada, Philippines	Mikey Bustos, AntsCanada	Vlogger, entomologist, singer, and comedian. Prolific ant-keeper and seller of his AntsCanada brand of ant-keeping products.
Marcus Butler	United Kingdom	marcusbutlerTV, moremarcus	British vlogger.
Shay Carl Butler	United States	Shaycarl, SHAYTARDS, ShayLoss, iphoneTARD, WhenTheKidsGoToSleep	Daily life vlogger, comedian; has appeared on No Ordinary Family.
C
Eric Calderone	United States	331Erock	Guitarist known for creating heavy metal renditions of popular songs, film and television themes, and video game soundtracks.
Andrew Callaghan	United States	All Gas No Brakes	Interviewer who covers large events and fringe subcultures.
Meghan Camarena	United States	strawburry17	Video games, co-host for D XP video game show Polaris Primetime.
Bill Omar Carrasquillo	United States	OMI IN A HELLCAT	A YouTuber whose videos showed off his jewelry and automobile collections. He was sentenced to prison in 2022, and his channel was subsequently deleted.
Joseph Catalanello	United States	JoCat	Animation and gaming YouTuber known for videos about Dungeons & Dragons and Final Fantasy XIV.
Canal do Otário	Brazil	Canal do Otario, Canal do Otário (Sem Palavrão), Canal do Otário (Responde)	A Brazilian activist vlogger. Known by his work against misleading advertisement, freedom of speech and government propaganda.
Mandy Candy	Brazil	Mandy Candy	Produces content about transgender topics.
Taylor Caniff	United States	taylor caniff, Taylor Caniff	Viner and content creator.
Rob Cantor	United States	robcantor	Musical comedian known for being a member of Tally Hall
Alizé Carrère	United States	Crash Course Geography, Modern Explorer, Adaptation	Climate researcher and educator who posts videos about how humans are adapting to the climate.
Matt Carricker	United States	Demolition Ranch, Vet Ranch	Firearm YouTuber and veterinarian.
Dave and Don Carroll	Canada	sonsofmaxwell	Brothers and Celtic folk music duo. Created three popular music videos, beginning with "United Breaks Guitars" in protest of Dave's treatment at the hands of United Airlines which proved a public relations debacle for the airline. Named their channel in honor of their father.
Josh Carrott	United Kingdom	koreanenglishman	Content involving English people reacting to Korean culture.
Thomas Cassell	United Kingdom	Tom Syndicate, Syndicate	Known for his Minecraft and Call of Duty videos.
JC Caylen	United States	Jc Caylen, KianAndJc	Vlogger.
Kai Cenat	United States	Kai Cenat Live	Comedy live streams.
Amanda Cerny	United States	Amanda Cerny, AmandaCernyVlogs, and About Time	Former Viner who posts vlogs and skits.
Sayak Chakraborty	India	Let's start, withlovesayak	Actor and YouTuber known for his lifestyle vlogs.
Emma Chamberlain	United States	Emma Chamberlain	American comedy vlogger, member of the Sister Squad with James Charles and The Dolan Twins, host of the Ramble Official podcast Stupid Genius.
Greyson Chance	United States	greyson97	Singer discovered by Ellen DeGeneres, signed to record label. Notable for his cover of Lady Gaga's hit "Paparazzi".
Jim Chapman	United Kingdom	j1mmyb0bba	Pop culture and fashion vlogger.
James Charles	United States	James Charles	Controversial beauty influencer, makeup artist, known for being the first male ambassador for CoverGirl.
Gaurav Chaudhary	India	Technical Guruji, Gaurav Chaudhary	Gaurav is notable for producing YouTube videos concerning technology in Hindi & travel vlogs on another channel.
Chef and Francis	Japan	Cooking with Dog	Japanese cooking channel featuring a woman known as "Chef" and her toy poodle, Francis.
Mike Chen	United States	StrictlyDumpling, BeyondScience, BeyondScience2, MikeyChenX, CookWithMikey, EatWithMikey, TheChenDynasty, DoubleChenNews	Chinese-born American YouTuber known for food vlogs.
Chen Neng-chuan	Taiwan	晚安小雞官方頻道 (Goodnight Chicken)	Taiwanese YouTuber and live streamer known for his investigations of paranormal activity. Gained international attention following a staged kidnapping on YouTube.
Mama Cheung	Hong Kong	張媽媽廚房Mama Cheung	Makes videos about cooking.
SungWon Cho	United States	ProZD	Comedian, voice actor.
David Choi	United States	davidchoimusic, CT davidchoitalk	Singer-songwriter.
Jacob Christensen	United States	NakeyJakey	Video essayist
Maximillian Christensen	United States	Maximilian Dood	Gaming YouTuber and fighting game community personality known for his videos on various fighting games.
Sam Chui	Australia	Sam Chui	Aviation vlogger and blogger.
Clara Chung	United States	ClaraCMusic	Singer and guitarist.
Firoz Chuttipara	India	Village Food Channel	Cooking channel based in Kerala, India.
Clay	United States	Dream, DreamXD, Dream Team, Dream Shorts	Minecraft YouTuber known for his Minecraft Manhunt videos and survival multiplayer series.
Wilson Cleveland	United States	wilsoncleveland	Actor, producer and writer best known for producing short films and web series like The Temp Life. He also appears on Annoying Orange, BlackBoxTV and The Guild.
Scott Clifton	United States	TheoreticalBullshit	Topics include atheism, philosophy, ethics discussion, counter-apologetics. American daytime TV star.
Mike Clum	United States	Mike Clum	Documentarian known for producing films examining controversial YouTubers
Brian Tyler Cohen	United States	Bryan Tyler Cohen	Progressive political commentator, podcast host, and journalist.
Bradley Colburn	United States	theRadBrad	Let's Player who makes walkthrough videos. Recognized as one of the "top gaming creators" on YouTube according to CEO Susan Wojcicki.
Dave Joseph Colditz	United States	Davedays	Singer-songwriter and musician, known for his punk rock parodies of songs.
Casey Cole	United States	Breaking in the Habit	Franciscan friar and Catholic priest that makes videos about Catholicism.
Louis Cole	United Kingdom	FunForLouis	Filmmaker and YouTube personality.
Felix Colgrave	Australia	Felix Colgrave	Director, animator, cartoonist, filmmaker, artist and musician.
Kristina Collins	Canada	Kallmekris	Social media personality and former hairdresser. Most known for her skits with recurring characters (starting on TikTok), reaction videos, challenge videos, and haunted location exploration videos.
Connor Colquhoun	Japan	CDawgVA, ConnorDawg, Trash Taste, Trash Taste Highlights	Anime YouTuber and voice actor.
Patrick Condell	Ireland	patcondell	Comedian, antitheist; 35 of his videos were published to DVD.
Kurtis Conner	Canada	Kurtis Conner	Known for his comedic commentary videos. Guest star of Danny Gonzalez and Drew Gooden's "We Are Two Different People" tour.
Jack Conte	United States	jackcontemusic	Indie musician, singer, and songwriter. Co-founder of musical duo Pomplamoose. He also co-founded crowdfunding site Patreon.
Eugenia Cooney	United States	Eugenia Cooney	Clothing hauls, beauty, cosplay, and vlogs.
Brett Cooper	United States	Brett Cooper	Cultural and political commentator, former host of The Comments Section.
Eve Cornwell	United Kingdom	Eve Cornwell	StudyTuber later known for content surrounding her career as a lawyer.
Karl Coryat	United States	EdwardCurrent	Atheist satirist, anti-9/11 Truth movement activist, and musician.
Erika Costell	United States	P6UK	Model and singer. Posts vlogs and reaction videos. Former member of Jake Paul's Team 10.
Blimey Cow	United States	Blimey Cow, BlimeyCowVlog, Big Head Kid, Jordan Taylor	Comedy trio known for videos relating to Christianity, homeschooling, music, relationships, and social media.
Iman Crosson	United States	Alphacat, Iman	Actor, nationally known Obama impersonator; co-editor of We Are the World 25 for Haiti (YouTube edition).
Steven Crowder	Canada, United States	StevenCrowder, CrowderBits	Right-wing comedian, debater and commentator.
Lucas Cruikshank	United States	Fred, lucas	Was the No. 1 most subscribed channel before being surpassed by nigahiga in 2009. He starred as Fred Figglehorn in Fred: The Show on Nickelodeon in 2012 and Marvin in Marvin Marvin from 2012 to 2013.
Sabrina Cruz	Canada	Answer in Progress	Educational content.
Cara Cunningham	United States	(deleted YouTube account)	Actor and fashionista; created the viral "Leave Britney Alone!" video.
Jamie Curry	New Zealand	Jamie's World	New Zealand vlogger and comedian.
Shirley Curry	United States	Shirley Curry	Also known as Skyrim Grandma, known for her The Elder Scrolls V: Skyrim gameplay videos.
Michael Cusack	Australia	Michael Cusack	Animator, voice actor, and comedian. Creator of YOLO: Crystal Fantasy and co-creator of Smiling Friends, both on Adult Swim.
Steve Cutts	United Kingdom	Steve Cutts	Illustrator and animator.
D
Nicholas Dadbeh	United States	Star Wars Theory	Known for his content related to the Star Wars franchise.
Charli D'Amelio	United States	charli d'amelio	Dancer, vlogger and TikToker.
Dixie D'Amelio	United States	Dixie D'Amelio	Dancer, singer, vlogger and TikToker.
Damián Kuc	Argentina	Historias Innecesarias	Known for publishing videos about true crime, specially cases that happened in Argentina.
Adam Dahlberg	United States	SkyDoesMinecraft	A Minecraft YouTuber and musical artist.
Zubin Damania	United States	ZDoggMD	A doctor known for his hip hop inspired medical comedy videos.
Lasizwe Dambuza	South Africa	Lasizwe Dambuza	YouTuber, media personality.
Ian Danskin	United States	Innuendo Studios	Known for "The Alt-Right Playbook" series of videos.
George Davidson	United Kingdom	GeorgeNotFound, Not GeorgeNotFound, GeorgeWasFound, GeorgeNotFound Streams, GeorgeNotFound Shorts	Known for his Minecraft-related videos.
†Terry A. Davis	United States	TempleOS, Terry Davis, TAD, LoseThos, Terry A. Davis (all his official channels are now terminated) not all are archived but the main one was here on the Internet Archive	Schizophrenic Programmer known for live streaming himself on rants about topics such as governments and CIA agents known as "glowies" spying on him as well as in depth programing explanations while building the operating system TempleOS. He also often did Vlogs and played the drums.
Tom Davies	United Kingdom	GeoWizard	Gamer and adventurer, known for his skill at GeoGuessr and for his straight-line walking missions across various countries.
Hannah Pearl Davis	United States	JustPearlyThings	Controversial social media personality known for misogynistic commentary.
† Lynn Yamada Davis	United States	Cooking With Lynja	She was known for her cooking videos. She died of esophageal cancer in 2024.
Sebastian Garrett Davis	United States	Cart Narcs	Known for its videos where Davis confronts retail customers who leave their shopping carts in parking lots
Nataly Dawn	United States	natalydawn	Indie musician, singer, and songwriter.
Shane Dawson	United States	ShaneDawsonTV, ShaneDawsonTV2, shane	Makes comedy sketches and vlogs.
Alex Day	United Kingdom	nerimon	Has had a few United Kingdom top 40 hits after vlogging on YouTube.
Bill Day	United States	billschannel	Documentary filmmaker
Donald De La Haye Jr.	United States	Deestroying	American football player and member of FaZe Clan.
† Storm De Beul	Belgium	StormOutdoorsy	Belgian YouTuber known for outdoor recreation content. Died of hypothermia in Sarek National Park, Sweden in October 2024.
Eric Decker	United States	Airrack, Houseparty, Also Airrack	American YouTuber most well known for gaining one million subscribers in one year.
Philip DeFranco	United States	sxephil, PhilipDeFranco	News reporter, known for The Philip DeFranco Show, and being the creator of SourceFed.
Timothy DeLaGhetto	United States	TimothyDeLaGhetto, TraPhikMusik, TimsBakery	Filmmaker, musician, vlogger, rapper. Also known by his rap name Traphik.
Adore Delano (Danny Noriega)	United States	DannyNoriega	Following Idol, Noriega became a YouTube personality, performing skits as himself, in drag as Adore Delano, or as his other character, Angel Baby. In June 2009, Noriega released the music video for "24/7," featuring Diamonique. Other than Idol, Adore also competed on the 6th season and All Stars 2 of American TV show RuPaul's Drag Race.
Stephen Deleonardis	United States	SteveWillDoIt, Nelk	Challenges, pranks, vlogs.
Belle Delphine	United Kingdom	belle delphine	Notable for her glamour and cosplay modeling influenced by memes.
Doug DeMuro	United States	Doug DeMuro, More Doug DeMuro	American YouTuber known for his car reviews.
Sam Denby	United States, United Kingdom	Wendover Productions, Half as Interesting, Sam from Wendover, Extremeties, Jet Lag: The Game	Educational entertainment.
Deng Haiyan	United States	二爷故事	Former police officer in China.
Paul Denino	United States	Ice Poseidon	IRL Kick live streamer who previously streamed on YouTube, Mixer and Twitch.
Esmée Denters	Netherlands	esmeedenters	Singer, she covered songs by musicians like Justin Timberlake and Natasha Bedingfield.
Céline Dept	Belgium	CélineDept, Celine & Michiel	Soccer, pranks, challenges, also on TikTok.
Alfie Deyes	United Kingdom	Alfie Deyes, Alfie Deyes Vlogs, PointlessBlogGames	Vlogger, comedian and Let's Player.
†Diamond and Silk	United States	Diamond and Silk, Ditch and Switch	Former Democrats who became supporters of Donald Trump. "Diamond" died on January 8, 2023, of heart disease linked to high blood pressure.
Dianxi Xiaoge	China	滇西小哥dianxixiaoge	Chinese video blogger who makes videos about Yunnan's food and culture.
Victor DiBitetto	United States	VicDiBitetto	Stand-up comedian whose launch to fame starred with a YouTube video entitled, "Bread & Milk." He currently has over 70 million views on YouTube.
Tom Dickson	United States	Blendtec	Founder of Blendtec, and star of Will It Blend?.
Kadie Karen Diekmeyer	Canada	That Vegan Teacher	Canadian Internet personality and Animal rights activist who promotes veganism, sometimes in controversial ways.
Marié Digby	United States	MarieDigby	Singer-songwriter whose career picked up when she posted a video of herself covering the Rihanna song "Umbrella".
Jared Dines	United States	Jared Dines (th3ycharg3)	Musician, singer-songwriter; creates heavy metal themed videos, covers, paraodies, and original music.
Jaiden Dittfach	United States	Jaiden Animations	Artist and animator.
Rose Ellen Dix, Rosie Spaughton	United Kingdom	Rose Ellen Dix, TheRoxetera, Let's Play Games	Married couple Rose and Rosie are an English comedy and entertainment duo.
Christopher Dixon	United Kingdom	ChrisMD, Chris Dixon	Footballer and comedian.
Rubén Doblas	Norway, Spain	elrubiusOMG, Rubius Z	Gaming and vlogging videos.
David Dobrik	Slovakia, United States	David Dobrik, David Dobrik Too, Views Podcast	Vlogger, prankster, TikToker, former Viner and the de facto leader of the "Vlog Squad". He has gained a combined total of over 17 million subscribers as of 11 January 2019, since he began uploading videos in 2015.
Sina Doering	Germany	Sina-drums	Drummer and record producer known for song covers.
The Dolan Twins	United States	The Dolan Twins	Comedy duo.
Dancing Dolls	Japan	Replay849	Cover dance unit. Covered dances of such artists as Girls' Generation and 2NE1.
James Donaldson	United States	MrBeast, Beast Reacts, MrBeast 2, MrBeast Gaming, MrBeast 3	Known for his stunts, philanthropy, gaming videos and competitions. Overtook PewDiePie as the most-subscribed individual YouTuber in November 2022 and, since June 2, 2024 has been the most-subscribed YouTube channel.
Lisa Donovan	United States	LisaNova, lisa	Gained fame for her impersonation of Sarah Palin.
Jimmy Dore	United States	The Jimmy Dore Show	Progressive commentator.
Caitlin Doughty	United States	Caitlin Doughty – Ask A Mortician	"Ask a Mortician" a question-and-answer comedy series on death, death culture, and funeral practices, and promoting death acceptance and alternative funeral practices.
Jack Douglass	United States	jacksfilms, jackisanerd, SHUTUPDENNIS, featuredfridays, catlvr6969, JJJacksfilms	Creator of the "Your Grammar Sucks" and "YIAY" ("Yesterday I Asked You") series, as well as "The WTF Blanket", a parody of sleeved blankets.
† Kristina Đukić	Serbia	K1KA	Gamer, vlogger, and streamer, known by her online alias K1KA, or Kika. Her content on YouTube was focused on playing video games. She got into a controversy with another Serbian YouTube star, Baka Prase. After the drama finished, Kika had been harassed multiple times, which culminated in her allegedly committing suicide on 8 December 2021.
Gavin Dunne	Ireland	miracleofsound	Musician that specialises in video game music, creating songs based on characters from video games and other pop-culture topics.
Jerry Dyer	United Kingdom	Big Jet TV	Airport live streaming and content involving planes landing and taking off.
E
Lannan Eacott	Australia	LazarBeam	Known primarily for his Let's Play videos, "comedic riffs" and use of memes.
† Esther Earl	United States	Cookie4Monster4	Harry Potter and John Green fan. Died in 2010 from thyroid cancer.
Addison Rae Easterling	United States	Addison Rae	TikToker and former member of Hype House
† Tor Eckhoff	Norway	Apetor	Adventurer and daredevil known for his ice-skating and winter swimming videos. Died in 2021 from drowning.
Hajime Eda	Japan	Hajime Syacho, Hajime Syacho 2	Japanese YouTuber with two comedy channels. His first, "Hajme Syacho", has more than 7.8 million subscribers and 6.1 billion views, while his second, "Hajme Syacho 2", has more than 2 million subscribers and more than 700 million views.
Stuart Edge	United States	Stuart Edge, Stuart EdgeXtra	Prankster, musician, magician
Evan Edinger	United States/United Kingdom	Evan Edinger, Evan Edinger Travel	Known for his "British VS American" series
Tommy Edison	United States	TommyEdisonXP, BlindFilmCritic	Blind film critic
Berlin Edmond	United States	berleezy, Berlin, eezyTV	Gaming and comedy content
Jack Edwards	United Kingdom	Jack Edwards, Jack in the Books	BookTuber and originally a StudyTuber; Released a book titled The Uni-Verse: The Ultimate Guide to Surviving University
Sten Ekberg	Sweden	DrEkberg	Holistic chiropractor and former Olympic decathlete whose channel focuses on all aspects of holistic health.
Paul Elam	United States	An Ear For Men	Dedicated to commentary on antifeminism and men's rights movement
Lindsay Ellis	United States	Lindsay Ellis	General media analysis and critique.
Jeri Ellsworth	United States	JeriEllsworth	Self-taught electronics engineer, and chip designer; serial entrepreneur; co-inventor of "CastAR" augmented reality glasses
Tommy and Matthew End	United States	That's Amazing	Trick shots, especially bottle flipping and dice stacking
Saagar Enjeti, Krystal Ball, Ryan Grim, Emily Jashinsky	United States	Breaking Points	Political discussions
Yousef Erakat	United States	FouseyTUBE, DOSEofFOUSEY	Palestinian-American prankster, comedian, and motivational speaker. He is best known for the Yoga Pants Prank and the Spiderman in Real Life prank. He also maintains an active vlogging channel.
Michael van Erp	United Kingdom	CyclingMikey	Cycling
Kevin Espiritu	United States	Epic Gardening	Gardening
Jason Ethier	Canada	ImJayStation (terminated)	Vlogger who gained prominence for his fake prank videos.
Amber Lee Ettinger	United States	barelypolitical	Known as Obama Girl from the video "I Got a Crush... on Obama" and stars in many BarelyPolitical episodes
Austin Evans	United States	Austin Evans	Technology YouTuber most notable for his reviews, PC builds, and unboxings.
Nurse Even	United Kingdom	Nurse Even	He became known for social media videos depicting the experiences of nurses and other healthcare workers, particularly during the COVID-19 pandemic.
Seth Everman	Sweden	Seth Everman	Musician, author of the most-liked comment on YouTube
Brandon Ewing	United States	Atrioc, Atrioc Clips, Atrioc VODs, Lemonade Stand Clips	Politics
Justine Ezarik	United States	iJustine, otherijustine, ijustinesiphone, ijustinegaming, ijustinereviews	Video blogger and comedian.
F
F2Freestylers	United Kingdom	F2Freestylers	Duo comprising British freestyle footballers Jeremy Lynch and Billy Wingrove. They are best known for producing online video content for their eponymous YouTube channel.
Marsh Family	United Kingdom	MarshFamilySongs	English family musical group
Anthony Fantano	United States	theneedledrop, fantano	Reviews music through his channel The Needle Drop, which is also a Connecticut Public Radio podcast.
Lucas Rossi Feuerschütte	Brazil	Luba TV, Luba TV Games	Comedy videos, game content
FHProductionHK	Hong Kong	FHProductionHK	Makes comedy videos that focus on social issues
Hat Films	United Kingdom	Hat Films	English comedy and gaming YouTube channel comprising Ross Hornby, Alex Smith and Chris Trott. Since 2014, they have been part of the Yogscast network.
Stephen Findeisen	United States	Coffeezilla, Coffee Break	Exposes crypto scams
Benny and Rafi Fine	United States	REACT, People Vs Food, Try Not To, FBE, FBE Live	Brother creators/producers of the React video series (Kids, Teens, Elders, YouTubers, and Adults React) and MyMusic sitcom. Founded Fine Brothers Entertainment.
Pat Finnerty	United States	hududhsskso	Singer-guitarist and front person for Pat Finnerty and the Full Band and August is Falling.
David Firth	United Kingdom	David Firth, Fatpie2, Fatpie3, Fatpiemusic	Animator, director, musician, actor, voice actor
Mark Fischbach	United States	markiplier, markiplierGAME, markiplierTWITCH, Unus Annus	American YouTuber, gamer-commentator, actor, and comedian. Specializes in Let's Play videos, commonly of survival horror video games.
Fischer's	Japan	Fischer's, Fischer's-Secondary-	A Japanese YouTuber group belonging to Uuum, a multi-channel network with six members: Silk Road, Masai, Ndaho, Motoki, Zakao, and Dharma.
Rebecca Flint	United Kingdom	xBextahx	English YouTuber who went viral in Japan for her cover dances; later began a brief singing career under the name Beckii Cruel
Luis Fernando Flores	El Salvador	Fernanfloo	Salvadoran YouTuber who uploaded commented gameplays
Evan Fong	Canada	VanossGaming, Rynx, VanossGamingExtras	Known for his comedic video game commentaries with other creators.
Sara Maria Forsberg	Finland	SAARA (Smokahontas Official), West Toast TV	Impersonator, singer, interviewed on British BBC radio and Finnish public radio YLE, in which she confirmed that she was contacted by a producer of The Ellen DeGeneres Show.
Maximilian Arthur Fosh	United Kingdom	Max Fosh	English YouTuber known for comedic stunts and pranks based on loopholes.
Elle and Blair Fowler	United States	AllThatGlitters21, EllesGlitterGossip (Elle), otherjuicystar07, juicystar07 (Blair)	Sisters who post beauty and style-related tutorials and vlogs.
Xyla Foxlin	United States	Xyla Foxlin	Engineer and entrepreneur and YouTuber who designs and builds projects requiring woodworking and engineering skills.
Ruby Franke	United States	8 Passengers (terminated)	Mother of six that posted proclaimed "strict parental advice". Arrested August 30, 2023, for six counts of aggravated child abuse.
Connor Franta	United States	ConnorFranta, More Connor, (and formerly Our2ndLife)	Comedy vlogger, previously a member of the Our2ndLife channel
Gavin Free	United Kingdom	theslowmoguys, roosterteeth, letsplay, gamefails	Director, producer, voice actor, and cinematographer.
David Freiheit	Canada	Viva Frei	Law, politics
Lex Fridman	Russia, United States	Lex Fridman, Lex Clips	Computer scientist and host of the Lex Fridman Podcast
Autumn Fry	United States	Autumn's Armory	Child influencer and firearm reviewer
Colin Furze	United Kingdom	colinfurze	YouTuber, stuntman, inventor, fabricator, filmmaker and former plumber
G
Rémi Gaillard	France	Rémi GAILLARD	French humorist
Kasun Deegoda Gamage	Sri Lanka	Travel with Wife	Video blogger, adventure travel, humanitarian
Christine Gambito	United States	HappySlip, Christine Gambito	Known for her Filipino jokes, accent and virtues.
Gaming Historian (Norman Caruso)	United States	GamingHistorian	Extended documentaries on video game history
Gangavva	India	My Village Show	Actress and comedian who appears in skits focusing on the life of people in a Telangana village.
Ireedui "IZ" Gantogtokh	Mongolia	IZ	His videos cover a wide range of topics including trends, tech, education, motivational vlogs, politics and other cultural content
Ryan Garcia	United States	Ryan Garcia	Professional boxer, collaborates with various internet personalities
Jean-François Gariépy	Canada	JFG Tonight	YouTube personality, author, former neuroscience researcher
Germán Garmendia	Chile	HolaSoyGerman, HolaSoyGerman2, JuegaGerman	Chilean video producer and aspiring actor. The 10th most subscribed channel on YouTube, he currently has over 38 million subscribers and 3.8 billion video views. Garmendia makes monological observational comedy videos.
Joseph Garrett	United Kingdom	Stampylonghead	Known for his Minecraft videos.
Gary the Goat, Jimbo Bazoobi	Australia	Gary the Goat	Australian comedy group involving a comedian and a goat.
Jason Gastrow	United States	Videogamedunkey	Video game reviewer and comedian.
Jacob Geller	United States	Jacob Geller	Video essayist on video games and art
Guru Gembul	Indonesia	Guru Gembul	Indonesian activist, critic, teacher, and content creator
Gigi Getty	Canada	Gigi Gorgeous	Model, actress, and transgender activist
Gina	United States	Gibi ASMR	ASMR creator
Kassem Gharaibeh	United States	KassemG	Co-founder of Maker Studios, comedian, actor, and producer. Best known for his California On and Going Deep series.
Ghib Ojisan	Japan	GhibOjisan	Japanese travel YouTuber based in Singapore
Simone Giertz	Sweden/United States	Simone Giertz	Swedish inventor and maker, dubbed "the queen of useless robots" by The Guardian.
Brian David Gilbert	United States	Brian David Gilbert	Writer, comedian, actor, host, and musician
Gille	Japan	GILLEsound	Singer
Anthime Gionet	United States	Baked Alaska (terminated)	Former rapper and BuzzFeed commentator turned far-right anti-semite, white supremacist, and conspiracy theorist. Banned from Twitter in November 2017 and YouTube in October 2020 for hate speech, and arrested by the FBI after livestreaming on Twitch his participation in the 2021 United States Capitol attack.
Caroline Girvan	Ireland	Caroline Girvan	Fitness and personal trainer geared to women aiming to build strength and muscular endurance
Joey Gizzi	United States	AreYouKiddingTV	American internet challenge and entertainment channel
Lasse Gjertsen	Norway	Lasse Gjertsen	Animator, musician and videographer. Known for early YouTube hits.
Max Gleason	United States	SmoothMcGroove	A cappella renditions of video game music
Wolfe Glick	United States	WolfeyVGC	Competitive Pokémon player who makes Youtube videos discussing and explaining competitive Pokémon.
Alexa Goddard	United Kingdom	Alexa Goddard	British R&B singer who charted in the United Kingdom Top 40 after promoting herself through YouTube.
Ben Going	United States	boh3m3	Known for his video blogs and was an early YouTube partner.
William Gold	United Kingdom	Wilbur Soot, Wilbur Music	Gamer and singer-songwriter, known for his activities in the 2011 sandbox video game Minecraft.
Danny Gonzalez	United States	Danny Gonzalez, 2 Danny 2 Furious, Danny GAMEzalez, Fox Szn	Commentary youtuber known for his comedic commentary videos on a variety of topics.
Michelle Gooris	Netherlands	DutchPilotGirl	Dutch airline pilot known for documenting the life of a pilot and promoting learning to fly.
Drew Gooden	United States	Drew Gooden	Known for his comedic commentary videos and his "We Are Two Different People Tour" that he did with Danny Gonzalez and Kurtis Conner.
Wayne Goss	United Kingdom	gossmakeupartist, gossmakeupchat	Makeup artist and entrepreneur
Yuki Goto	Japan	Otto Totto Channel	Japanese YouTuber and former member of the duo EE Jump
† Edward "Edd" Gould	United Kingdom	Eddsworld	Flash animator and creator of the Eddsworld series. Died in 2012 from recurring infection caused by acute lymphoblastic leukemia.
Jamie Grace	United States	jGracePro	Singer-songwriter discovered by TobyMac and signed to Gotee Records.
Joey Graceffa	United States	JoeyGraceffa, JoeyGraceffaGames	Vlogger, actor and host at Teen.com. His videos' topics are varied and include vlogs of his daily life, challenges, song covers, The Hunger Games trilogy and gaming videos.
Sue Jacquot	United States	GrammaCrackers	Gaming YouTuber known for Minecraft content.
Darryl Dwayne Granberry Jr.	United States	DDG, PontiacMadeDDG Vlogs	Rapper and vlogger
Adam John Grandmaison	United States	Adam22, No Jumper, No Jumper Clips	Hip Hop and adult film content
Kina Grannis	United States	kinagrannis	Singer-songwriter formerly signed to Interscope Records. Mostly known for her song "In Your Arms".
Emily Graslie	United States	brainscoop	Blogger from Field Museum
† Charles Green Jr.	United States	TheAngryGrandpaShow, GrandpasCorner	Known for videos of him violently raging and reacting to various pranks and events. Died in 2017 of cirrhosis.
Charles Green V	United States	CG5	Singer-songwriter, producer
GloZell Green	United States	glozell1	Actress, comedian and singer
John and Hank Green	United States	vlogbrothers, CrashCourse, SciShow, various others	Vloggers, authors, musician (Hank only), educators and podcasters.
Laci Green	United States	lacigreen, gogreen18	Atheist, feminist, sex educator
Jess Greenberg	United Kingdom	JessGreenberg1	Acoustic guitar player who covers a variety of songs
The Gregory Brothers	United States	schmoyoho, thegregorybrothers	Creators of several "songified" videos using Autotune, most notably the "Bed Intruder Song", the "Double Rainbow Song", "Winning!" (w/ Charlie Sheen), and the "Auto-tune the News" series.
Alyssa Grenfell	United States	Alyssa Grenfell	Ex-Mormon commentary
Grey	United States/United Kingdom	CGP Grey	Makes informational videos, including "The Difference between the United Kingdom, Great Britain, and England Explained" and "Rules for the Rulers".
† Christina Grimmie	United States	zeldaxlove64 Christina Grimmie	Singer-songwriter. Killed in 2016 as victim of a murder-suicide.
Parry Gripp	United States	ParryGripp	Singer-songwriter as well as lead vocalist and guitarist for the pop punk band Nerf Herder, creator of various happy jingles.
Michael Grzesiek	Canada	Shroud, Shroudy Rowdy	Gaming content
Andrew Gunadie	Canada	gunnarolla, dietgunnarolla	Canadian internet personality, musician, and video producer.
Gawr Gura	United States	Gawr Gura Ch. hololive-EN	Virtual YouTuber with Hololive Production
Manuel Gutierrez Jr.	United States	MannyMua733	Beauty influencer, makeup artist, and first male brand ambassador for Maybelline cosmetics.
Eva Gutowski	United States	MyLifeAsEva	Vlogger, actress and YouTube personality.
H
Matthew Haag	United States	NaDeSHoT	Former OpTic Gaming eSports player, and current owner of eSports organisation 100 Thieves.
Zach Hadel	United States	psychicpebbles	Animator, voice actor, and comedian. Recurring co-host of OneyPlays, and co-creator of Adult Swim's Smiling Friends.
Peter Hadfield	United Kingdom	Potholer54, Potholer54debunks	Science journalist who vlogs on science and pseudoscience, particularity on creationism vs evolution and global warming.
Dave Hakkens	Netherlands	One Army, One Army Community	Dutch designer best known for Phonebloks and Precious Plastic.
Atta Halilintar	Indonesia	Atta Halilintar	First Indonesian YouTuber to cross 20 million subscribers mark
Bryce Hall	United States	Bryce Hall	Dancer, vlogger and TikToker
Jeremy Hambly	United States	TheQuartering, UnsleevedMedia, ClawStruck	YouTuber and social commentator
Caleb Hammer	United States	Financial Audit	YouTuber who analyzes personal finance of guests on his show, Financial Audit
Lewis Hancox	England	Lewis Hancox	English filmmaker, graphic novelist, social media personality and transgender activist
Gabbie Hanna	United States	Gabbie Hanna, More Gabbie Hanna	Comedian, actress, author, and singer-songwriter that gained popularity on Vine before amassing a total of 8.2 million subscribers combined on her two YouTube channels.
Arin Hanson	United States	Egoraptor, GameGrumps	Animator, voice actor, actor, and video game pundit known for his animations (such as the Awesome Series, Sequelitis, and Girlchan in Paradise!!) and co-creating the Let's Play series, Game Grumps. Member of musical comedy group Starbomb.
Brady Haran	Australia	Periodic Videos, Sixty Symbols, Numberphile, Computerphile	Journalist
Daniel Hardcastle	United Kingdom	OfficialNerdCubed, OfficiallyNerdCubed, OfficialNerdCubedLive	A British Gamer, primarily releases let's plays and occasional vlogs. Released a book titled Fuck Yeah: Video Games, which reached number one on The Sunday Times best sellers list.
Ash Hardell	United States	Ash Hardell, More Ash and Gray	Known for being a voice for the LGBTQIA+ community and creating education content about sexual and gender diversity.
Brandon Hardesty	United States	UndoTube	Actor
Chris Harris	United Kingdom	Chris Harris on Cars, (formerly) Drive	Automotive journalist, his roadtest between a LaFerrari, McLaren P1 and Porsche 918 received over one million views within two weeks.
Cyriak Harris	United Kingdom	cyriak	English freelance animator and composer known mononymously as Cyriak.
Joel Haver	United States	Joel Haver	American animator known for his comedy sketches, which frequently use rotoscoped animation.
Chloé Hayden	Australia	Chloé Hayden	Autistic actor and autism rights advocate, who makes videos about the autistic experience. Released a book titled Different, Not Less: A Neurodivergent's Guide to Embracing Your True Self and Finding Your Happily Ever After.
Hannah Hart	United States	myharto, yourharto	She is best known for starring in My Drunk Kitchen, a weekly series on YouTube. Apart from her main channel, she also runs a second channel where she talks about life in general and gives her opinions on various topics.
Mamrie Hart	United States	YouDeserveADrink, mametown	Comedian, actress, writer, and performer. On her main channel, YouDeserveADrink, she primarily posts weekly instructional mixology videos, with a unique cocktail presented in each, allowing her to combine her past work experience as a bartender with performing. She periodically collaborates with other YouTube personalities such as Hannah Hart and Grace Helbig.
Vi Hart	United States	Vihart	Mathematician, educator, inventor, and self-described "recreational mathemusician and hexaflexagon enthusiast".
† Emily Hartridge	United Kingdom	Emily Hartridge	Vlogger, known for discussing sex, relationships, love, gender, and mental health. Killed in an e-scooter accident in 2019.
Abrar Hassan	Pakistan	WildLens by Abrar	Travel and adventure vlogging
Joanna Hausmann	Venezuela	Joanna Hausmann	Gained popularity through her videos on her channel as well as on Univision's bilingual platform, Flama.
Steven He	United States	Steven He	Chinese Irish comedian. Coined the phrase "Emotional Damage".
Andy Hearnden	Australia	Andy Cooks	Food and cooking with recipes, tips, tricks, recipe requests, and more.
Grace Helbig	United States	itsgrace, dailygrace (former)	Actress, comedian and video blogger from Los Angeles
Andrew Mark Henry	United States	Religion for Breakfast	Education relating to religious studies
Alejandro Hernández	Venezuela	Alejandro Hernandez	Creator of The Alejandro Hernández Show
Elena Herraiz	Spain	Linguriosa	Makes informative content about Spanish language and linguistics. Since 2024, she has appeared on the TV show Cifras y letras.
Brandon Herrera	United States	Brandon Herrera	Also known as "The AK Guy". Content primarily focuses on firearms.
Ryan Higa	United States	nigahiga, HigaTV	Comedy sketches. The 40th most subscribed YouTube channel. As of late 2020, he had taken a break from YouTube.
Caitlin Hill	Australia	S Facts	Rapper
Jaclyn Hill	United States	Jaclynhill1	Known for her makeup tutorial videos
Lewis Hilsenteger	Canada	unboxtherapy	Unboxing and technology YouTube channel produced by Lewis George Hilsenteger and Jack McCann
John Hindhaugh, Nick Daman	United Kingdom	exint2, Nismotv2013	Motorsport commentators, live commentary on radio-controlled racing and Super GT (via his Radio Le Mans livestream) in addition to his endurance racing work he is best known for.
Rachel Hofstetter	United States	Valkyrae	The first female gamer and content creator for 100Thieves, a competitive American esports team.
Sam Holmes	United States	Sam Holmes Sailing	Sailor who records his journeys across the journey
Tyler Hoover	United States	Hoovie's Garage	Automotive journalist and vlogger
Hoshimachi Suisei	Japan	Suisei Channel	A VTuber and singer associated with Hololive Production.
Rahat Hossain	United States	MagicOfRahat, RahatsIphone	An Old Dominion University student who produces magic tricks and pranks on his YouTube channel "MagicOfRahat", which has over 7 million subscribers and 1 billion video views
Sabine Hossenfelder	Germany	Sabine Hossenfelder	Sabine is a theoretical physicist, science communicator, author, musician, singer, and YouTuber
Houshou Marine	Japan	Marine Ch. 宝鐘マリン	A VTuber and singer associated with Hololive Production.
Daniel Howell	United Kingdom	Daniel Howell (formerly danisnotonfire), danisnotinteresting, DanAndPhilGAMES	A British vlogger and former radio host, co-host of Super Amazing Project; released a book titled The Amazing Book Is Not on Fire with Phil Lester.
HowToBasic	Australia	HowToBasic, HowToBasic2	An Australian vlogger who makes misleading tutorial videos, notably by destroying large quantities of food and various housewares.
Mark Hoyle	United Kingdom	LadBaby, LadBaby & Sons	Life hacks, pranks, parenting and family, social media challenges, children's toy reviews
Zack Hoyt	United States	Asmongold, Asmongold TV, Asmondgold, ZackRawrr	World of Warcraft and related gaming content
Andrew Huang	Canada	ANDREW HUANG	Canadian musician best known for his Song Challenge series which invites viewers to dare him in feats of musicianship, and viral hit "Pink Fluffy Unicorns Dancing on Rainbows"
Cary and Michael Huang	United States	jacknjellify, Zack Bone Productions; Cary: carykh, Humany, Abacaba, lazykh, cubykh Michael: Michael H, Yoyle Cake	Chinese-American creators, best known for their web series Battle for Dream Island.
Chase Hudson	United States	LILHUDDY	American TikToker and vlogger
Jake Hurwitz and Amir Blumenfeld	United States/Israel	CollegeHumor (Jake and Amir)	Comedy writers and actors for the website CollegeHumor. They star in their web series Jake and Amir and other CollegeHumor sketches. They have since left the company and ended the series to try to get the series on television. They also host their own podcast, If I Were You.
Corpse Husband	United States	Corpse Husband, CORPSE, Corpse Husband Gaming & Clips	Singer and Let's Player, best known for his low-pitched and deep voice, and his Among Us Let's Plays with other gamers and YouTubers
Candice Hutchings	Canada	Edgy Veg	Vegan chef and comedian.
Richard Hy	United States	Angry Cops	Law enforcement and military-based comedic skits and commentary
I
Guillermo Díaz Ibáñez	Spain	Willyrex, TheWillyrex	Gaming, vlogging
Alejo Igoa	Argentina	Alejo Igoa	Argentine YouTuber
Bogdan Ilić	Serbia	Baka Prase (terminated), Baka Prase TV (terminated), Baka Sepra, Baka Prase 2	Controversial rapper, gamer, entertainer
Kelsey Impicciche	United States	Kelsey Impicciche (formerly Kelsey Dangerous), BuzzFeed Multiplayer	Gaming YouTuber known for playing the 100 Baby Challenge in The Sims 4
Inugami Korone	Japan	Korone Ch. 戌神ころね	VTuber associated with Hololive Production
Ironmouse	United States	Ironmouse	A VTuber and a founding member of VShojo.
Ramsey Khalid Ismael	United States/South Korea	Johnny Somali	Travel vlogger and self-proclaimed internet troll. Youtube channel was deleted in 2024
Vidya Iyer	United States	Vidya Vox	Singer known for combining popular western and Indian songs
J
James Jackson	United States	Onision	Controversial entertainer, musician and author.
Jon Jafari	United States	JonTronShow, GameGrumps	Unorthodox video game reviewer, creator of JonTron and co-creator of Game Grumps.
Jelle Van Vucht	United States	Jelly	Dutch YouTuber known for gaming and reaction content.
Pooja Jain	India	Dhinchak Pooja	Indian YouTuber known for her appearance on the reality show Bigg Boss. Considered "the queen of cringe pop".
James A. Janisse, Chelsea Rebecca	United States	Dead Meat	YouTube channel dedicated to horror film/games and other horror-adjacent media. Best known for covering the body count of character and creature deaths in movies and video games.
Janoskians	Australia	Janoskians, DareSundays	An Australian web-based comedy group
Shanmukh Jaswanth	India	Shanmukh Jaswanth	Creates short comedy videos, series and dance videos. Best known for The Software Devloveper series.
Derrick Jaxn	United States	Derrick Jaxn	Creates relationship advice content
Ronald Jenkees	United States	ronaldjenkees	American composer and musician
Jeong Haneul	South Korea	Bukshital TV (북시탈tv)	Former North Korean soldier that defected to South Korea and now makes videos about North Korea
Jerma985	United States	Jerma985	American gamer and Twitch streamer known for his unconventional content
La Divaza (Pedro Luis Joao)	Venezuela	La Divaza, Keeping up with LA DIVAZA	Uploads gaming, comedy, vlogs and Let's Play videos
Griffin Johnson	United States	The Armchair Historian	YouTube channel dedicated to history topics
Gus Johnson	United States	gustoonz	Sketch comedian, YouTube commentator, and podcast host
Jarvis Johnson	United States	Jarvis Johnson	Commentary YouTuber and former software engineer
Lia Marie Johnson	United States	liamariejohnson	Known for her time on Kids React and Teens React
Ray William Johnson	United States	RayWilliamJohnson, yourfavoritemartian, BreakingNYC	Was the No.1 most subscribed channel before being surpassed by Smosh in 2013. Reviews viral videos. Has a second channel with animated music videos.
Samuel Johnson	United States	brownmarkfilms	Known as Samwell, is most notable for the video "What What (In the Butt)".
Ian Jomha	United States	iDubbbzTV	Absurdist comedian known for his Content Cop series and the internet memes he has helped to create
Austin Jones	United States	AusdudePro	Controversial American singer who was discovered on YouTube
Danielle Jones	United States	Mama Doctor Jones	American obstetrician-gynecologist
David Jones	New Zealand	davidsjones	YouTuber, filmmaker, and content creator known for fingerboarding tutorials, DIY projects, and charitable initiatives such as the Cardborghini auction for Starship Children's Hospital.
David L. Jones	Australia	eevblog	Electronic engineer
Alexis Jordan	United States	Alexis Jordan	Singer-songwriter, actress and first season contestant on America's Got Talent; signed to Jay Z's Roc Nation label through her exposure on her YouTube channel.
Sungha Jung	Korea	jwcfree	Guitarist
John Jurasek	United States	TheReportOfTheWeek	American YouTube personality, food critic, and radio host.
K
Ali Kabbani	United States	Myth	Fortnite player
Jessie Kahnweiler	United States	jbkpictures1	Comedy channel
Hikaru Kaihatsu	Japan	HIKAKIN, hikakinTV, HikakinBlog	Japanese human beatbox, food and product reviews
Ryan Kaji	United States	Ryan's World (formerly RyanToysReview)	Children's channel
Noah Kalina	United States	NK5000	Notable for his video "Noah takes a photo of himself every day for 6 years".
Laura Kampf	Germany	Laura Kampf	DIY maker
Suma Kanakala	India	Suma	Television anchor
Kanaria (musician)	Japan	Kanaria	Musician and VTuber
Youna Kang	United States	CodeMiko	Korean-American VTuber known for pushing the envelope in regard to interactivity in VTuber technology.
Jawed Karim	United States	Jawed	YouTube co-founder who created the first YouTube channel and uploaded the first YouTube video, Me at the zoo, in 2005.
Herne Katha	Nepal	Herne Katha	Short documentaries about regular people
Kip Kedersha	United States	kipkay	Prankster, gadget creator.
Keekihime	Austria	keekihime	Austrian YouTuber and singer who posts vlogs about Japanese pop culture and cover dances
Daniel Keem	United States	DramaAlert, KEEMSTAR, DramaAlertShorts, Keem Stonks	American YouTuber and host of Internet popular culture news show DramaAlert.
Broden Kelly, Mark Bonanno, Zachary Ruane	Australia	Aunty Donna, Grouse House	Absurdist comedy troupe notable for their filmed sketches.
Lucia Keskin	United Kingdom	Chi with a C	Known for reenacting TV episodes with herself playing all roles, assisted by greenscreen.
Gursimran Khamba, Tanmay Bhat	India	All India Bakchod	Comedians. AIB is a typical news comedy show that aims to find comedy in tragedy.
Salman Khan	United States	Khan Academy	Educational videos on a wide range of topics.
Michelle Khare	United States	Michelle Khare	She is the host of "Challenge Accepted," which demonstrates her passion for quickly picking up new skills and studying various vocations in a short amount of time.
Sahil Khattar	India	Khattarnaak, Being Indian	Television host, actor
Lily Ki	United States	LilyPichu, comfi beats	Korean-American Twitch streamer
Kim Jung Hwa	Korea	JFlaMusic	Singer, music artist, composer
Zach King	United States	Zach King, FinalCutKing	Known for digitally edited videos.
Greg Kinman	United States	Hickok45	Firearm reviewer and internet personality with over 5 million subscribers.
Thomas James Kirk III	United States	TheAmazingAtheist, TJ Kirk	YouTube personality, podcaster
Camille and Kennerly Kitt	United States	Camille and Kennerly	Identical twin duet harpists known for their acoustic and electric harp covers, also called the Harp Twins.
Kizuna AI	Japan	A.I.Channel, A.I.Games, A.I.Channel China	Jump started the Vtuber trend on YouTube. Vlog, singing, gaming.
Felix Kjellberg	Sweden/United Kingdom/Japan	PewDiePie	Video game playthroughs, commentary, and vlogger, PewDiePie has been the second-most subscribed channel on YouTube since 14 April 2019 when it was surpassed by T-Series in the aftermath of their competition to be the first channel to reach 100 million subscribers. He remained the most-subscribed independent YouTuber until MrBeast surpassed him in November 2022. Listed as the number one most influential online creator in the United Kingdom by The Sunday Times.
Marzia Kjellberg	Italy/United Kingdom	Marzia	Italian blogger, wife of PewDiePie. Video topics usually discuss fashion or makeup. In October 2018, Marzia retired from YouTube and her channel is no longer active.
Ethan and Hila Klein	United States/Israel	h3h3Productions, H3 Podcast Highlights, H3 Podcast, and Ethan and Hila	Creators of comedy YouTube channel h3h3Productions.
Ian Kochinski	United States	Vaush	Left-wing YouTuber and livestreamer known for his political debates
Nicholas Kolcheff	United States	NICKMERCS, More NICKMERCS, NICKMERCS Shorts	Plays Fortnite, Call of Duty: Warzone and Apex Legends
Prajakta Koli	India	MostlySane	Comedy video creator and celebrity interviewer.
Cody Kolodziejzyk	Canada	codyko69, KoldWorld, TinyMeatGang	YouTube commentator, comedian and podcaster
Liza Koshy	United States	Liza Koshy, Liza Koshy Too	Actress and comedian, former Viner; she posts comic videos and collaborates with friends and her ex-boyfriend, David Dobrik.
Maxim Kozlov	United States	Cellopedia	Accomplished Russian-American cellist creating educational videos about playing the cello
Taras Kulakov	United States	CrazyRussianHacker	A Russian-American YouTuber best known for his "life hacks", scientific experiments, testing videos and his motto "Safety is number one priority."
Kyle Kulinski	United States	Secular Talk	Left-wing political commentator.
Arunabh Kumar	India	The Viral Fever	Founder of TVF which is popular for web series and comedy videos
Ophir Kutiel	Israel	kutiman	Multi-instrumentalist, composer, arranger, bandleader, and creator of ThruYou.
Kuzuha	Japan	Kuzuha Channel	VTuber associated with Nijisanji
L
Kat La, Betty La, Kimberly La, Wenny La, Allen La	Canada	ItsFunneh	Gaming YouTubers known for playing Roblox, vlogs
Judson Laipply	United States	judsonlaipply	American motivational speaker from Bucyrys, Ohio best known for his performance in the "Evolution of Dance" video.
Sunny Lam	Hong Kong	whiteboard250	Singer-songwriter
Khabane Serigne Lame	Italy, Senegal	Khaby. Lame	Senegalese and Italian influencer, currently the most followed account on TikTok.
Yoav Landau, Sam Haft	Israel, United States	The Living Tombstone	Israeli-American electronic rock band and YouTube channel most notable for their songs on video games and pop culture.
Steven Lannum	United States	AreYouKiddingTV	American internet challenge and entertainment channel
Lisa Lavie	Canada	lisalavie1	Singer-songwriter; co-producer of YouTube cybercollaboration video We Are the World 25 for Haiti (YouTube edition); Yanni vocalist; Trans-Siberian Orchestra vocalist.
Ally Law	United Kingdom	Ally Law	Parkour climber and free soloist
Kian Lawley	United States	superkian13, KianAndJc	YouTuber and actor
Paige Layle	Canada	Paige Layle	Autistic autism advocate who makes videos about the autistic experience, released a book titled But Everyone Feels This Way: How an Autism Diagnosis Saved My Life.
Bryan Le	United States	RiceGum, RiceLive, FamilyGum	American YouTube vlogger and rapper known for his diss tracks.
Bethan Leadley	United Kingdom	Leadley	Musician
Amanda Lee	United States	LeeandLie, LeeandLieTV	Singer, voice actress, and Vtuber known for her English-language interpretations of songs from anime and video games
Caspar Lee	South Africa/United Kingdom	Caspar, morecaspar	British South African vlogger, popular for his interviews with other YouTube personalities such as Zoe Sugg.
Jason Y. Lee	United States	Jubilee	A media company responsible for several popular videos series, including Middle Ground, Ask Me Anything, and Odd Man Out.
Laura Lee	United States	laura88lee	Beauty influencer
Sandra Lee	United States	Dr. Sandra Lee (aka Dr. Pimple Popper)	American dermatologist most known for her treatments of pimples, blackheads, and cysts
C.W. Lemoine	United States	C.W. Lemoine, Life with Mover	F-16 and F/A-18 pilot of USAF and USN
Felix Lengyel	Canada	xQcOW	Former Overwatch pro player who streams gaming and reactions.
William Lenney	United Kingdom	WillNE	Comedian and prankster
Philip Lester	United Kingdom	AmazingPhil, LessAmazingPhil, DanAndPhilGAMES	British vlogger and former radio host, co-host of Super Amazing Project, released a book titled The Amazing Book Is Not on Fire with Daniel Howell.
Shallon Lester	United States	Shallon Lester	American gossip columnist, author, and editor.
Ryan Letourneau	Canada	Northernlion	Gaming YouTuber most notable for videos on various indie games.
Li Zehua	China	Kcriss Li	Chinese journalist formerly employed at China Central Television. Li was arrested 26 February 2020 in Wuhan while investigating the disappearance of journalist Chen Qiushi and the arising COVID-19 pandemic. Li's only video since his arrest was from 22 April 2020, consisting of a stilted apology for his prior videos and criticism of the Chinese government.
Li Ziqi	China	李子柒 Liziqi	Chinese video blogger and entrepreneur. She is known for creating food and handicraft preparation videos often from basic ingredients and tools using traditional Chinese techniques. With 16 million subscribers as of 21 August 2021, she holds the Guinness World Record for "the most subscribers for a Chinese language channel on YouTube".
PJ Liguori	United Kingdom	KickThePJ, PJTheKick	British YouTuber and filmmaker, known for his creative fantasy videos, vlogs, and short films, his most notable work being Oscar's Hotel for Fantastical Creatures.
Lim Jeong-Hyun	South Korea	funtwohimself	Guitarist
Tyrone Lindo	United Kingdom	GRIMEREPORTTV, Noisey	Known by his stage name Big Narstie. Grime MC who makes comedy videos including reaction videos and the agony aunt parody series Uncle Pain
Dua Lipa	United Kingdom	Dua Lipa	Pop singer-songwriter; Uploaded videos of herself covering songs by other artists early in her career
† Gonzalo Lira	United States	Coach Red Pill	Created videos dedicated to anti-feminism, and the Russian invasion of Ukraine. Died of pneumonia in Ukrainian custody in January 2024
Daniel "Dan" Lloyd, Matthew Stephens, Simon Richardson	United Kingdom	Global Cycling Network	Focuses on road cycling and racing news. All presenters had past notability as professional cyclists.
Mike Lombardo	United States	MikeLombardoMusic	Controversial American former piano rock musician. He was known for writing piano-driven rock songs and posting them on YouTube.
Vanessa Lopes	Brazil	Vanessa Lopes	lifestyle vlog
Jared Lee Loughner	United States	Classitup10	Used to promote religious and political views; Perpetrator of the 2011 Tucson Shooting.
Daniel LaBelle	United States	Daniel LaBelle	Creates comedic humor
Ludwig	United States	Ludwig, Mogul Mail, Ludwin	Gaming and commentary
Lauren Luke	United Kingdom	panacea81	Make-up artist
Benjamin Lupo	United States	DrLupo	Gaming content
Maddie Lymburner	Canada	MadFit	Creates exercise videos for at-home workouts
Drew Lynch	United States	Drew Lynch	American comedian ("the Stuttering Comedian") known for his Dog Vlog and observational comedy
Chelcie Lynn	United States	Chelcie Lynn	American comedian. Skits and mukbangs
Vladimir Lyubovny	United States	djvlad	Hip Hop interviews
M
James and Rodfil Macasero	Philippines	moymoypalaboy	Filipino comic and singing duo, known for lip sync videos.
Frankie MacDonald	Canada	dogsandwolves	Amateur weather presenter with autism from Nova Scotia, Canada.
Megan and Liz Mace	United States	MeganandLiz, meganandlizbeauty	American pop duo composed of fraternal twin sisters, achieved some popularity on YouTube, appeared on The Oprah Winfrey Show.
MacGyver the Lizard	United States	MacGyverLizard	A giant lizard known for his intelligence, friendly personality, and large jowls.
Harry Mack	United States	Harry Mack	Freestyle rap
Mack and Damer	United States	OCR Kings	Dedicated to helping others succeed in their fitness journey, especially in running and Obstacle Course Racing.
Made With Lau	United States	MadeWithLau	Makes videos about cooking
Nisha Madhulika	India	NishaMadhulika	Indian home chef. Videos of North Indian vegetarian food recipes.
Austin Mahone	United States	Austin Mahone	Pop singer who built a large online following in 2011.
Rajiv Malhotra	United States	Rajiv Malhotra Official	Academician who promotes an indigenous perspective of India and its worldview.
Vennu Mallesh	India	Vennu Mallesh	Known for his song "It's My Life Whatever I Want To Do"
Garnt Maneetapho	United Kingdom/Japan	Gigguk, Trash Taste, Trash Taste Highlights	Anime and otaku YouTuber and podcaster
Scott Manley	United Kingdom	Scott Manley	Notable for addressing the niche community of space enthusiasts and gamers alike by playing both space-related video games and making informative blogs on up-to-date science topics. He is best known for playing Kerbal Space Program. He lived most of his life in Scotland, but has recently moved to San Francisco, California.
Juan Mann	Australia	juanmann	Founder of the Free Hugs Campaign
Orya Maqbool Jan	Pakistan	Orya Maqbool Jan	Pakistani journalist, columnist and anchor person
Jordan Maron	United States	CaptainSparklez, Maron Music	Notable for making Minecraft music videos and walkthroughs
Eleonora Pons Maronese	United States	LelePons	Comedian, prankster, musician, vlogger, and former Viner
Lukas Marques, Daniel Mologni	Brazil	Você Sabia?	Edutainment videos about trivia, theories, mysteries, and other topics
James William Marriott	United Kingdom	James Marriott, James More-iott	Comedian and singer-songwriter
Geoff Marshall	United Kingdom	Geoff Marshall	Video producer, performer and author from London who runs a YouTube channel which is predominantly transport themed
Martin	Hong Kong	dim cook guide	Makes videos about cooking and travelling
Ariel Rebecca Martin	United States	Baby Ariel	Started on Musical.ly before making music and acting
Philip Mason	United Kingdom	Thunderf00t	Scientist and atheist vlogger, creator of the video series Why People Laugh at Creationists
Francesco Matano	Italy	Frank Matano, FRANK MATANO Games	Italian comedian, television personality, YouTuber, and actor
Jordan Matter	United States	Jordan Matter	Makes videos with his daughter Salish, formerly about her doing gymnastics but has since moved onto challenge videos.
Wode Maya	Ghana	MrGhanaBaby	Produces YouTube videos on life in China and Africa
Mazzi Maz	United Kingdom	TheMazziMaz	English vlogger. He eventually started a rap career under the name Scarlxrd.
Jenn McAllister	United States	jennxpenn, jenn, jennxpenngames	YouTuber and actress
† Moses McCormick	United States	laoshu505000	Known for speaking several languages to native speakers. Died in 2021 from heart complications.
Stephen McCullagh	United Kingdom	Votesaxon07	A YouTuber from Northern Ireland most known for publishing a pre-recorded livestream to serve as a fake alibi when he murdered his partner. His channel was suspended after he was found guilty of the murder.
J. J. McCullough	Canada	J. J. McCullough	Columnist and writer.
Charlotte McDonnell (formerly Charlie McDonnell)	United Kingdom	charlieissocoollike, charlieissoboredlike, CharlieAtE3	British vlogger and singer-songwriter. Member of the Chartjackers team, Chameleon Circuit and Sons of Admirals.
Andy McKee	United States	Andy McKee	A fingerstyle guitarist who was formerly signed to the United States-American record label CandyRat Records
Miles McKenna	United States	MilesChronicles	Known for LGBTQIA+ advocacy
Rhett McLaughlin and Link Neal	United States	RhettandLink, Good Mythical Morning, Good Mythical MORE, This Is Mythical	Known for their weekday morning YouTube show, Good Mythical Morning
Seán William McLoughlin	Ireland	Jacksepticeye	Irish producer, game commentator, and internet personality, known primarily for his comedic Let's Play series on video games and occasional vlogs on YouTube
Anna McNulty	Canada	Anna McNulty, Anna McNulty Stretches, Anna McNulty Top Videos	Self-taught contortionist and YouTube's top Canadian creator of the year in 2023
Calum McSwiggan	United Kingdom	Calum McSwiggan	LGBT+ lifestyle content
Vivienne Medrano	United States	VivziePop	Salvadoran American animator, illustrator, comic creator, and voice actress. Founder of SpindleHorse Toons and creator of webcomic ZooPhobia, adult animated musical series Hazbin Hotel, and its spin-off web series Helluva Boss.
Mark Meechan	United Kingdom	Count Dankula	Scottish YouTuber, stand-up comedian and former European Parliament candidate
Alan Melikdjanian	Latvia	Captain Disillusion	Creator of the "Captain Disillusion" series demonstrating visual effects used in many viral videos
Projekt Melody	United States	Projekt Melody	A VTuber and founding member of VShojo, also known for streaming on Twitch and Chaturbate
Merton	United States	PianoChatImprov	Singer-songwriter, music improviser
Michael Messineo	Australia	Mike's Mic	Known for his series recapping television shows and videos about pop culture
Bunny Meyer	United States	grav3yardgirl	Her vlogs focus on fashion, makeup, lifestyle and paranormal occurrences.
Daniel Middleton	United Kingdom	DanTDM, DanTDM Live, DanTDM Shorts, MoreTDM	A British gaming commentator focused mostly on the popular sandbox game, Minecraft
Beau Miles	Australia	Beau Miles	Educator, author, and outdoorsman
Bobby Miller	United States	BuzzFeed, SoulPancake, Next New Networks, YouTube	Filmmaker, comedian, actor
George Miller	United States/Japan	TVFilthyFrank, TooDamnFilthy	Popular comedian and YouTube personality with the alter egos of Filthy Frank and Pink Guy, who has retired. Currently, he is a musician, under the name Joji, with songs and albums charting.
Max Miller	United States	Tasting History with Max Miller	Host of Tasting History, a cooking/history fusion web-show that recreates ancient recipes and explains the history around them
Kayli Mills	United States	MewKiyoko	American voice actress who first got her career started through YouTube by singing English-language covers of anime songs
Minato Aqua	Japan	Aqua Ch. 湊あくあ	Retired VTuber associated with Hololive Production
Tanner Minecraft	Canada	SmallAnt	Known for speedrunning and video game content, such as races and challenges
Mira	Hong Kong	Mira's Garden	Makes videos about living in South Korea and travelling
Baptista Miranda	Angola	Baptista Miranda	Makes humorous videos about the differences between Brazil and Angola
John Mitzewich	United States	Food Wishes	Cooking, focused on video recipes. Noted for his "hands-and-pans" style in which his face is largely off-camera.
Amin Mohamed	United Kingdom	Chunkz	Internet personality and member of Beta Squad
Stefan Molyneux	Canada	stefbot	Far-right, white nationalist Canadian podcaster
Tana Mongeau	United States	Tana Mongeau	Known for her "storytime" videos
Kevin Monsalve	Venezuela	MasKevMo, GamerKevMo	Known for the "El Politigato" animated shorts series
Gabriel Montiel	Mexico	Werevertumorro	Spanish vlogger. Videos mainly based around average life in suburban Mexico City. Also a professional Association Football player.
Adam Montoya	United States	SeaNanners Gaming Channel	Known for his extensive Let's Play videos, as well as collaborations with other gamers such as PewDiePie and Markiplier.
Leo Moracchioli	Norway	Frog Leap Studios	Singer and multi-instrumentalist
Bryant Moreland	United States	EDP445	Known for his rants videos about the Philadelphia Eagles, as well as for multiple controversies involving sex crimes against children
Harley Morenstein	Canada	EpicMealTime, HarleyMore, OriginalGamerShow	Known for his Epic Meal Time cooking show
Elliott Morgan, Lee Newton, and Joe Bereta	United States	SourceFed	Hosts of SourceFed's 20 Minutes or Less news show and Comment Commentary launched by Philip DeFranco
Hamako Mori	Japan	Gamer Grandma	World's oldest gaming YouTuber, at the age of 90
Eric Morino	United States	PointCrow	Known for streaming video games including Pokémon and The Legend of Zelda
Matteo Moroni	Italy	DmPranksProductions	Italian prankster, creative director and filmmaker
Laina Morris	United States	wzr0713	Gained fame in June 2012 when her video titled "JB Fanvideo" went viral, resulting in the creation of the internet meme "Overly Attached Girlfriend." She uploads weekly videos as herself on a variety of topics.
Loveliveserve	United States	loveliveserve	American comedy duo YouTube channel
Matthew David Morris	United States	MattyBRaps, MattyB	Internet musician
David Michael Moses	United States	FatherDavidMichael	Roman Catholic priest
Bethany Mota	United States	Bethany Mota	Known for haul videos, makeup/hair tutorials, recipes, and do it yourself. Mota was a contestant on the 19th American season of Dancing with the Stars.
Steve Mould	United Kingdom	Steve Mould	British educational YouTuber, author, and science presenter
Lauren Mountain	United States	Glam&Gore	Known under the pseudonym "Mykie" for beauty and special effects makeup tutorials
Jenna Mourey	United States	JennaMarbles, JennaMarblesVlog, JennaJulienPodcast	8th most subscribed woman in the world, with more than 18 million subscribers and 2.9 billion views; best known for her video "How to trick people into thinking you're good looking", which has 67 million views
Mori Calliope	Japan	Mori Calliope Ch. hololive-EN	A musician and VTuber associated with Hololive Production
MrMarmot	United States	一隻土撥鼠MrMarmot	Chinese artist, political commentator, and VTuber living in the United States
Derek Muller	Australia	Veritasium	Creator of Veritasium and host of YouTube's Geek Week
David Murray	United States	The 8-Bit Guy, 8-Bit Keys	American retrocomputing enthusiast
Mathew Murray	Canada	teenagerswebseries	Creator of the web series teenagers
Karim Musa	Italy	Yotobi, Secondo Canale di Yotobi, YotobiGames	Italian YouTuber and streamer.
† Edward Muscare	United States	Edarem	Former sex offender who achieved popularity for his eccentric videos of himself. In 2010, he was imprisoned for uploading videos to YouTube, thereby breaking his probation's ban on using a computer. Died in 2012 while in jail from lung cancer.
Willy Myco	Puerto Rico	WillysWorld	Creates educational videos on how to make psychedelic drugs.
Kyle Myers	United States	FPSRussia, MoreFPSRussia, fps	Host of the FPSRussia Show
Giorgos Manolopoulos	Greece	Manos	Greek YouTuber known for his comedy videos, skits and music.
N
Ajey Nagar	India	CarryMinati, CarryisLive	Creates comic content where he publishes satirical opinions known as 'roasts' about a multitude of topics primarily in the Indian entertainment industry. Also posts live gaming streams and other gaming-related humorous content.
Kevin Nalty	United States	nalts	Video blogger and comedian
Terra Naomi	United States	terranaomi	Singer-songwriter formerly signed to Island Records
Tariq Nasheed	United States	Tariq Radio	Troll known for his gossip, rumor spreading, threats, and theatrics
Élodie Nassar	France	MissJirachi	French YouTuber known for videos related to Pokémon. She was hired by L'Oréal for a campaign on women and science and also obtained a contract with the French youth TV network channel Gulli.
Natsuiro Matsuri	Japan	Matsuri Channel 夏色まつり	VTuber associated with Hololive Production
Ana Nedeljković	Serbia	Enn La Rush	Serbian singer, TV personality, YouTuber and internet personality.
Adam Neely	United States	Adam Neely	Known for his videos about jazz, music theory, and other topics related to music. Also a member of the electro-jazz duo Sungazer with jazz drummer Shawn Crowder.
Casey Neistat	United States	CaseyNeistat, Casey Neistat's Snap Stories, Casey Neistat Classics	American videographer; posts vlogs on his YouTube channel with over 11 million subscribers and more than 2.4 billion views
Ui Nema	Japan	根間ういちゃんねる	VTuber who focuses on Ryukyuan culture
Felipe Neto	Brazil	Felipe Neto	Brazilian YouTuber and businessman
Luccas Neto	Brazil	LUCCAS TOON	Brazilian YouTuber and comedian
Waldemar Dalenogare Neto	Brazil	Dalenogare Críticas	Brazilian movie critic known for his film reviews
Mikey Neumann	United States	FilmJoy	Known for the film criticism series Movies with Mikey
Neuro-sama	United Kingdom	Neuro-sama	A chatbot-style VTuber notable for being generated by artificial intelligence
Nigel Ng	United Kingdom, United States	mrnigelng	Comedian known for the character Uncle Roger, who critiques cooking videos on Asian cuisine
Luke Nichols	United States	outdoorboys, catfishandcarp	Outdoorsman with an emphasis on cooking, camping, travel, survival, and family content
Megan Nicole	United States	megannicolesite, MeganNicoleTV	Musician, who has covered songs by Bruno Mars, Taylor Swift, Katy Perry and Selena Gomez, among others. Has also performed some original songs.
Sara Niemietz	United States	SaraNiemietz	Singer, songwriter, actress featured on The Ellen DeGeneres Show
Niki and Gabi	United States	Niki and Gabi	Musicians, actresses, and a YouTube duo composed of twin sisters Niki DeMar and Gabi DeMartino.
Ingrid Nilsen	United States	missglamorazzi, TheGridMonster	Known for beauty tutorials
Julie Nolke	Canada	Julie Nolke	Canadian comedian known for the Explaining the Pandemic to my Past Self miniseries, which was nominated for a 2021 Webby Award. Nolke won 2021 Webby Awards in Best Individual Performance and two Audience Choice Awards for best viral video and best writing.
Julia Nunes	United States	jaaaaaaa	Singer, songwriter, guitar and ukulele player. Has performed with Ben Folds and appears regularly at the Bonnaroo Music Festival.
Whindersson Nunes	Brazil	whinderssonnunes	Comedian, actor, musician and boxer
Safiya Nygaard	United States	Safiya Nygaard	Comedy, beauty, and fashion
Bjørn Nyland	Norway	Bjørn Nyland, Teslabjorn Live, Teslabjorn Thai	Thailand-born Norwegian YouTuber about electric car road trips, has won four Teslas
Nguyễn Thành Nam	Vietnam	NTN, Mr Nam Vlogs, Mr Nam Gaming	Vietnamese YouTuber known for large-scale challenge videos and viral content
O
Alex O'Connor	United Kingdom	CosmicSkeptic	Atheist YouTuber known for his videos on theology, philosophy, and politics
Ross O'Donovan	Australia	RubberNinja	Australian American animator, comedian, and internet personality. Co-host of Game Grumps spin-off, Steam Train. Creator of Good Game series, Gamer Tonight.
Christopher O'Neil	Ireland	OneyNG, OneyPlays	Animator, voice actor, comedian, Let's Player, and game developer. Founder of OneyPlays and OneyWare.
† Peter Oakley	United Kingdom	geriatric1927	"Geriatric gripes and grumbles", mentioned his service for Britain during WWII. Died in 2014 of cancer.
Tyler Oakley	United States	tyleroakley, extratyler	Vlogger and advocate for gay youth, presenting on topics such as postqueer politics and pop culture
Olajide Olatunji	United Kingdom	KSI, JJ Olatunji, Sidemen, MoreSidemen	Known for his FIFA commentary videos, rap music, and boxing fights against YouTubers Joe Weller and Logan Paul; listed as the second most influential online creator in the United Kingdom by The Sunday Times. Co-founding member of the YouTube group Sidemen.
Melody Oliveria	United States	bowiechick	Blogger and YouTube personality
Tyler Oliveira	United States	TylerOliveira	Investigative journalist who frequently conducts man-on-the-street interviews
Qupanuk Olsen	Greenland	Q's Greenland	Greenlandic engineer who makes Greenland's travel series
Dan Olson	Canada	Folding Ideas	Albertan documentarian and video essayist
† Jahseh Onfroy	United States/Jamaica	XXXTENTACION	Mostly known for his music. On YouTube, he was known for starting #THEHELPINGHANDCHALLENGE and his gaming videos before his death. Killed in 2018 in apparent robbery, possibly targeted.
Nikolas Omilana	United Kingdom	Niko Omilana	Prankster
Daniil Orain	Russia	1420 by Daniil Orain	Russian YouTuber known for his channel "1420" in which he conducts street interviews, asking passers-by about various topics such as the Russian invasion of Ukraine
Pedro Orochi	Brazil	Orochinho	Brazilian YouTuber known for making humorous reactions to videos of games and anime
Marina Orlova	Russia	hotforwords	Russian philologist who teaches the etymology of English words
William Osman	United States	William Osman	Engineer
Dakota Rose Ostrenga	United States, Japan	kotakoti	American Beauty YouTuber and model based in Japan who went viral in Asia for being a "real-life Barbie doll"
Lorenzo Ostuni	Italy	FavijTV, LORE	Gamer, mainly known for being the former most-subscribed Italian speaking channel
Kenia Guadalupe Flores Osuna	Mexico	Kenia Os	Video blogger and makeup videos (had two channels with the name Kenia Os)
P
Anthony Padilla, Ian Hecox	United States	Smosh, Smosh Pit, Smosh Games, SmoshCast, SmoshAlike	A popular comedy channel, holding the No. 1 spot for most YouTube subscribers for periods of time around the early 2010s
David Pakman	Argentina/United States	David Pakman Show, Pakman Live	Political commentator
Venus Palermo	Switzerland	Venus Angelic	Had a No. 71 hit with a cover of "I Love It". Known for her doll-like appearance.
Dominic Panganiban	Canada	Domics	Animator and webcomic artist
Rosanna Pansino	United States	RosannaPansino	Creator of the baking show Nerdy Nummies
Park Hye-min	South Korea	PONYMakeup	South Korean Beauty YouTuber
Graeme Parker	United Kingdom	The Hoof GP, The Hoof GP Clips	Cattle hoof trimming videos and vlogs
Matt Parker	United Kingdom	standupmaths	Recreational mathematics author and educator
Barbie Parsons	United States	Barbie the Welder	Welded sculpture artist that makes videos about welding
Matthew Patrick	United States	The Game Theorists, The Film Theorists, The Food Theorists, The Style Theorists, GTLive	Creator of Game Theory, a show that analyzes video games with respect to realistic rules of mathematics, culture, and science
Daymon Patterson	United States	Daym Drops	Food critic
Balaji Patturaj	India	Panjumittai Productions	Popularly known as RJ Balaji. Also called "The Voice of Chennai", all the videos on his channel deal with contemporary issues; all are completely different in content.
Jake Paul	United States	Jake Paul, Jake Paul Random, BS w/ Jake Paul Clips	Viner and actor turned professional boxer
Logan Paul	United States	Logan Paul, IMPAULSIVE, IMPAULSIVE Clips	Former viner, vlogger, and podcaster signed to WWE
† Randolph Pausch	United States		Gave the lecture "Really Achieving Your Childhood Dreams". Died in 2008 of pancreatic cancer.
Ethan Payne	United Kingdom	Behzinga, Beh2inga	Known for his gaming, football, comedy and fitness videos; listed as the 31st most influential online creator in the United Kingdom by The Sunday Times. Co-founding member of YouTube group Sidemen.
Trisha Paytas	United States	blndsundoll4mJ	Vlogger, actress, singer, and songwriter
Joe Penna	Brazil	MysteryGuitarMan, jp	Musician and animator. Was in 2011 the most subscribed Brazilian auteur.
Louise Pentland	United Kingdom	sprinkleofglitter, sprinkleofchatter	British fashion and beauty vlogger
Samuel Pepper	United Kingdom	OFFICIALsampepper	Former prankster known for practical joke videos on the general public
Felipe Bressanim Pereira	Brazil	Felca	Known for his comedic and sarcastic personal commentary, and especially his video on adultification of children on YouTube.
Kevin Perjurer	United States	Defunctland	Known for documentary series about defunct amusement park attractions and defunct television series, especially those involving the Walt Disney Company
Nicholas Perry	United States	Nikocado Avocado	Controversial extreme eater and mukbanger
Coyote Peterson	United States	Brave Wilderness, Coyote Peterson	Wildlife educator.
Haley Pham	United States	Haley Pham, Haley Pham Vlogs, The Traphamily (formerly)	Booktuber.
Michelle Phan	United States	MichellePhan	Vietnamese-American makeup artist and owner of skincare line IQQU; she produces beauty tutorials videos and is the spokesperson for Lancôme.
Danny and Michael Philippou	Australia	RackaRacka	Live-action horror comedy videos
Ben Phillips	United Kingdom	Ben Phillips	Prank videos and former Viner.
Randy Phillips	United States	AreYouSurprised	While serving in the United States Air Force, he came out as a homosexual during the final months of the U.S. military's policy known as "Don't ask, don't tell".
James Phyrillas	United States	Schaffrillas Productions	Film and animation reviewer, formerly focused on YouTube Poop content
Jonti Picking	United Kingdom	mrweebl	Animator and musician, known for Badgers, Amazing Horse, and Narwhals.
Hasan Piker	United States	HasanAbi, Fear & Malding Podcast	Left-wing YouTuber, Twitch streamer and political commentator, host of The Breakdown for TYT. Nephew of Cenk Uygur.
John Plant	Australia	Primitive Technology	Making tools, buildings, food from scratch in Far North Queensland, Australia.
† Greg Plitt	United States	Greg Plitt	Personal trainer and actor. Killed in 2015 when struck by a train during video production.
Sean Plott	United States	day9tv	A Kansas-born StarCraft: Brood War professional who has since become a popular StarCraft II commentator and e-sports promoter. Plott is most known for his daily show; where he breaks down SC2 games for analysis, and shoutcasting at events such as MLG and Dreamhack
Dave Plummer	Canada	Dave's Garage, Dave's Attic	A Canadian programmer known for his work on Microsoft Windows.
Pomplamoose	United States	PomplamooseMusic	A musical duo composed of Jack Conte and Nataly Dawn.
Tim Pool	United States	Timcast, Tim Pool, Subverse	Journalist and political/social commentator. Known for early adoption of livestreaming to cover protests such as Occupy Wall Street.
Anthony Potero	United States	Anthpo	Known primarily for his viral stunts and events, such as the Timothée Chalamet look-alike contest, Cheeseball Man, Kid with Crocs, and later, Bunch of Friends.
Ben Potter	United States	Comicstorian, Mangastorian, Eligible Monster Gaming	Known primarily for covering, explaining, and providing commentary on comic books
DeStorm Power	United States	DeStorm, DeStormTV	Singer, songwriter, and video editor. Often collaborates with other YouTube personalities and artists, including Mystery Guitar Man and Vassy.
Lachlan Power	Australia	Lachlan, LachlanPlayz, Lachlan Shorts	Known primarily for his video game commentaries of Fortnite Battle Royale
Rikki Poynter	United States	RikkiPoynter	Deaf culture and accessibility activism; formerly beauty vlogs
Edward Pratt	United Kingdom	Ed Pratt	Best known for circumnavigating the globe on a unicycle.
† Gaspar Prim Díaz	Argentina	Gaspi	Known for his provocative street interviews. Killed in the 2026 Rio de Janeiro mid-air collision.
Q
Anthony Quintal	United States	Lohanthony	Former LGBT viner and youtuber
R
Jacob Rabon IV	United States	Alpharad, Replay Hut, Alpharad Platinum, Not Alpharad, Alpharad Replay	Esports personality and musician, particularly known for Super Smash Bros. videos
Samuel and NiaChel Rader	United States	samuel8955	Family vloggers based out of Terrell, Texas, who vlog about their daily life as a Christian family.
Antonio Radić	Croatia	agadmator's Chess Channel	Game reviews and analysis of historical and current chess games
AJ Rafael	United States	AJ Rafael	Filipino-American singer-songwriter and activist
Adam Ragusea	United States	Adam Ragusea	Cooking and general food related videos and podcasts
Randy Rainbow	United States	Randy Rainbow Official	Comedian and singer known for political and musical parodies.
Jamie Raines	United Kingdom	Jammidodger	Author who's mainly known for LGBTQ+ centered content.
†Mikayla Raines	United States	SaveAFox Rescue	Wildlife rescuer known for saving foxes from fur farms, committed suicide in 2025.
Rainych	Indonesia	Rainych Ran	Singer
Andrew Rakich	United States	Atun-Shei Films	Filmmaker and vlogger who covers American history and historic films
James Rallison	United States	TheOdd1sOut, TheOdd2sOut	Artist and animator
Franchesca Ramsey	United States	chescaleigh	Comedian, activist and artist. Known for her comedy sketches like "Shit White Girls Say...To Black Girls" and as the host of MTV's Decoded.
Grace Randolph	United States	Beyond the Trailer	Reporter, film critic, and comic book writer
Dhruv Rathee	India	Dhruv Rathee, Dhruv Rathee Vlogs	Social media activist known for his political commentary.
Andrew Rea	United States	Babish Culinary Universe	Cooking, with four series hosted by Rea: Binging with Babish, recreation of foods from fiction; Basics with Babish, general culinary instruction; Being with Babish, cataloging Rea's efforts to help fans in need; and Botched by Babish, in which Rea corrects errors in recipes previously featured on the channel.
Ann Reardon	Australia	How To Cook That	Website and baking channel that provides video recipes on baking and decorating themed cakes, desserts, chocolate creations and other confectionery.
Rebel News	Canada	Rebel News, and Rebel News Clips	Canadian far-right social and political commentary channel
Michael Reeves	United States	Michael Reeves	Former software contractor known for making videos about technology and programming, also known for his repeated use of tasers
Henry Reich	Unknown	MinutePhysics, MinuteEarth	Known for explaining physics- and Earth-related topics
Jus Reign	Canada	JusReign, JusReignToo, SnapReign, Just2Boyz	Canadian comedian of Indian Sikh descent.
Juliette Reilly	United States	Juliette Reilly	Musician and vlogger
Ángel David Revilla	Venezuela	DrossRotzank	First Venezuelan to reach one million subscribers, known for uploading horror videos
Rezo	Germany	Rezo, Rezo ja lol ey	Most notable for The destruction of the CDU
Imran Riaz Khan	Pakistan	Imran Riaz Khan	Pakistani Youtuber and journalist
Benjamin Rich	United Kingdom	bald and bankrupt, Daily Bald	Travel vlogger
Joshua Richards	Canada	Josh Richards, BFFs: Dave Portnoy, Josh Richards & Bri Chickenfry	TikToker, vlogger and podcaster
Thomas James Ridgewell	United Kingdom	TomSka	Known for creating the animated comedy web film series asdfmovies.
Jesse Riedel	United States	Jesser	Basketball challenges and meeting professional athletes
Lauren Riihimaki	Canada	LaurDIY	Known for her intriguing DIY videos
Rim	Japan	RIM	Singer and VTuber
RinRin Doll	United States, Japan	rinrindoll, rinrindolljapan	American YouTuber based in Japan who posts vlogs and beauty tutorials on lolita fashion
Matthew Rinaudo	United States	Mizkif, Mizkif Clips, Mizkif VODs	IRL live streams
Brent Rivera	United States	Brent Rivera, SoRelatable Podcast	American YouTube personality, actor
Jodie Rivera	United States	venetianprincess	Previously, No. 1 most subscribed female YouTuber, prior to MichellePhan surpassing her
Dennis Roady	United States	howtoPRANKitup, Dennis Roady Deeds	Prankster
Mark Rober	United States	Mark Rober	Former NASA engineer best known for his YouTube videos on popular science, do-it-yourself gadgets and creative ideas.
Colin Robertson	United Kingdom	Millennial Woes	Alt-right promoter of white supremacy, white nationalism, antisemitism and Islamophobia.
Paul Robinett	United States	renetto	Vlogger and entrepreneur
Edwin Rodriguez	United States	edbassmaster	Comedian, prankster, television personality
Olan Rogers	United States	OlanRogers	Comedian who entertains by narrating self written stories. Creator of Final Space.
James Rolfe	United States	Cinemassacre (formerly JamesNintendoNerd), James Rolfe	Filmmaker and video game reviewer, known for his Angry Video Game Nerd sketches
Jake Roper	United States	Vsauce3, Jake Roper	Host of the Vsauce3 edutainment channel
Emile Rosales	United States	chuggaaconroy	Let's Player best known for his walkthroughs of various video games, mainly released on Nintendo platforms
Jessica Rose, Yousef Abu-Taleb, Jackson Davis, and Alexandra Dreyfus	United States	lonelygirl15	From lonelygirl15
Mia Rose	United Kingdom	miaarose	Singer-songwriter
Adin Ross	United States	Adin Ross, Adin Live, Extra Adin	American Twitch streamer and YouTube vlogger known for streaming Grand Theft Auto V and NBA 2K. Also streams IRL content which includes him talking to popular rap artists.
Louis Rossmann	United States	Louis Rossmann	Computer repair technician and right to repair activist
Cristine Rotenberg	Canada	Simply Nailogical, Simply Not Logical, Holo Taco, SimplyPodLogical, SimplyPodLogical Highlights	Nail art and comedy videos
Timothy Rowett	United Kingdom	Grand Illusions	Presented by British toy collector Tim "The Toyman" Rowett, and developed by former BBC producers Hendrik Ball and George Auckland
Levy Rozman	United States	Gotham Chess	Chess International Master and commentator
Ivan Rudskyi	Ukraine	EeOneGuy, FeedOneGuy, awen	Vlogs and Let's Plays
S
Alejandro Saab	United States	KaggyFilms, CyYuVods	American voice actor who first got his career started through YouTube by posting Dragon Ball Z and other anime-related content from 2010–2023 as KaggyFilms; currently active as a VTuber under the name CyYu
Mehdi Sadaghdar	Canada	ElectroBOOM	Electronics engineer who teaches both electrical engineering and simple how-tos with comedic elements
Mubashir Saddique	Pakistan	Village Food Secrets, Mubashir Saddique	Known for cooking in Village style
Naoki Saito	Japan	Naoki Saito Illust Channel	Japanese manga artist and illustrator for Dragalia Lost, Duel Masters Trading Card Game, Pokémon Trading Card Game, and Hatsune Miku merchandise
Sakamata Chloe	Japan	Chloe ch. 沙花叉クロヱ - holoX -	VTuber associated with Hololive Production
Sakura Miko	Japan	Miko Ch. さくらみこ	VTuber associated with Hololive Production
Masahiro Sakurai	Japan	Masahiro Sakurai on Creating Games	A video game director and designer who created a YouTube channel focused on game development and design in 2022.
Taimoor Salahuddin	Pakistan	Taimoor Salahuddin aka Mooroo, Mooroo Podcasts	Pakistani YouTuber, writer, Internet personality, filmmaker, actor and musician
Adam Saleh	United States	Adam Saleh	Vlogs and public pranks
† Kevin Samuels	United States	Kevin Samuels	Discussed relationships and standards
Thomas Sanders	United States	Thomas Sanders	Musical theatre actor and singer who became famous through his career on Vine and now has a career as a full-time YouTuber
Grant Sanderson	United States	3Blue1Brown	Mathematics educator
Destin Sandlin	United States	SmarterEveryDay, No Dumb Questions, SmarterEveryDay 2	Hosts educational engineering series Smarter Every Day (SED), which is hosted on his main channel. Started podcast called No Dumb Questions with his friend, Matt Whitman.
Joe Santagato	United States	Joe Santagato, Extra Joe, Veterans Minimum	Comedian, vlogger
Peter Santenello	United States	Peter Santenello	A mixture of travel vlogging and journalism
Joey Santore	United States	Crime Pays But Botany Doesn't	Amateur botanist known for his "Bill Swerski-esque" Chicago accent and use of profanity
Matthew Santoro	Canada	Matthew Santoro, MatthewSantoroVlog, SantoroGaming	Best known for his top ten lists and "50 Amazing Facts" videos
Douglas Sarine and Kent Nichols	United States	digitalfilmmaker	Creators of Ask a Ninja
Anita Sarkeesian	United States	Feminist Frequency	Has received particular attention for her video series Tropes vs. Women in Video Games, which examines tropes in the depiction of female video game characters. Was a primary subject of the Gamergate harassment campaign.
Tkachov Sava, Tkachov Yan	Japan	SAWAYAN CHANNEL, SAWAYAN GAMES	YouTuber group of Ukrainians Tkachev Sawa and Tkachev Jan working in Japan. They are mainly known for playing Mario Kart 8.
Josh Scherer	United States	Mythical Kitchen	Food and cooking YouTuber, previously a culinary producer for Good Mythical Morning.
Peter Schiff	United States	SchiffReport	A financial broker and CEO of Euro Pacific Capital, Schiff is known for the video "Peter Schiff Was Right 2006–2007 (2nd Edition)" by YouTuber Jdouche. His internet fame created a grassroots movement which prompted him to run for Senate in Connecticut, albeit unsuccessfully.
Schlatt	United States	jschlattLIVE, Schlatt & Co.	Known for his variety of online content, including gaming, vlogging, reactions, skits, and music covers.
Jon Schmidt, Steven Sharp Nelson, Tel Stewart, Paul Anderson, and Al van der Beek	United States	The Piano Guys	Musical group
Kurt Hugo Schneider	United States	KurtHugoSchneider	Producing YouTube music videos in collaboration with other musicians. He is best known for his production of music videos for Sam Tsui.
Ross Scott	United States	Accursed Farms	Known for his machinima series Freeman's Mind and Civil Protection, for his video game review series Ross's Game Dungeon, and for his video game preservation activism through the Stop Killing Games movement
Tom Scott	United Kingdom	Tom Scott, Tom Scott Plus, Matt and Tom, The Technical Difficulties, Lateral with Tom Scott	Known for his series Things You Might Not Know and other popular science videos
Linus Sebastian	Canada	LinusTechTips, LinusCatTips, TechQuickie, TechLinked, ChannelSuperFun, LMG Clips, CarpoolCritics, ShortCircuit	Technology expert, co-founder and CEO of Linus Media Group, primarily known as the presenter for the agency's various channels and formerly NCIX Tech Tips
Sam Seder	United States	The Majority Report with Sam Seder	Liberal commentator
† Muudea Sedik	United States	Twomad	Canadian YouTuber, streamer, and comedian known for video game comedy videos and Zoombombing activity. Died in 2024 of a drug overdose.
Naomi Seibt	Germany	Naomi Seibt	Climate change denialist who also makes videos about immigration, feminism and various other socio-political topics
Ken Sekine	Japan	megwin	Video blogger and comedian
Rathindu Senarathna	Sri Lanka	Ratta	Prominent philanthropist and YouTuber in Sri Lanka.
Seo Ae-jin	South Korea	The Showry Show	Shock comedy and parody videos
SethBling	United States	SethBling	An American Let's Play commentator who is known for his contributions to the 2011 video game Minecraft and speedrunning records
Shirley Setia	New Zealand	shirleysetia	Singer from Auckland known for Bollywood covers
Jordan Shanks-Markovina	Australia	friendlyjordies	Center-left political commentator, journalist, stand-up comedian. Conducts independent investigations into political corruption in New South Wales, for which he has been the target of several assassination attempts.
Abdullah El Sharif	Egypt	Abdullah Elshrif	Political commentator known for his criticism of the Egyptian government
Shaun	United Kingdom	Shaun	Left-wing YouTuber known for debunking alt-right claims
† Aziz Shavershian	Australia	7zyzz7	Australian internet personality, known for his bodybuilding videos. Died of a heart attack in 2011.
Mathew and Savanna Shaw	United States	MatandSavanna	American musical duo based in Utah
David McCleary Sheldon	United States	Mac Lethal	Rapper, producer, radio host. In November 2011, Mac Lethal released a video on YouTube of him rapping over the beat to "Look at Me Now" while he prepares a dish of pancakes in his kitchen. The video became a viral hit and got millions of views in a matter of days.
Lia Shelesh	United States	SSSniperWolf, sexysexysniper	Known for her Let's Play and reaction video videos
Beryl Shereshewsky	United States	Beryl Shereshewsky	Food and cooking YouTuber, creating videos showcasing global cuisine
Ui Shigure	Japan	しぐれうい	VTuber and artist
Peter Shukoff	United States	nicepeter, nicepeterToo, ERB, ERB2	A self-described "Comic/Guitar Hero" best known for the musical comedy on his YouTube channel, NicePeter, and co-creating the comedy web series, known as Epic Rap Battles of History, along with Lloyd Ahlquist (aka EpicLLOYD).
Sidemen	United Kingdom	Sidemen, MoreSidemen, SidemenReacts	Known for their football challenge videos, video game commentary videos, and their weekly videos uploaded to the Sidemen YouTube channel dubbed "Sidemen Sundays".
Charith N. Silva	Sri Lanka	Wild Cookbook	Sri Lankan celebrity chef and digital entrepreneur, best known as the creator of the Wild Cookbook YouTube channel.
Thomas Simons	United Kingdom	TommyInnit	Known for his Minecraft-related videos.
Kayla Sims	United States	lilsimsie	Gaming YouTuber known for playing The Sims 4
† Jeremiah Simms	United States	Cyrus	YouTuber and musician known for his commentary videos. Died of a drug overdose in 2025.
William Singe	Australia	stashhurrikane	Singer, songwriter and producer known for recording R&B, pop, hip-hop and rap covers in his bedroom.
Kanwer Singh	Canada	Humble The Poet	Canadian YouTube personality, author, rapper and spoken-word artist
Lilly Singh	Canada	IISuperwomanII, SuperwomanVlogs, Lilly Singh, Lilly Singh Vlogs	Indian-Canadian comedian known for her parody videos about everyday life. Her channel has over 15 million subscribers and 3.3 billion video views.
Harry Sisson	United States	Harry Sisson	Liberal political commentator.
Troye Sivan	Australia	TroyeSivan, MoreTroye	South-African born Australian vlogger, singer and actor
Joelle Joanie "JoJo" Siwa	United States	Its JoJo Siwa	Makes content primarily for young children.
Robert Skinner	United Kingdom	Cavetown	Musician, singer-songwriter
Jason Slaughter	Canada/Netherlands	Not Just Bikes	Canadian-Dutch YouTuber who covers urbanist issues, such as cycling, walkability, transportation, infrastructure, and built environment.
William Sledd	United States	WilliamSledd	Vlogger who produces videos which center around fashion.
Clara Sorrenti	Canada	Keffals	Far-left, transgender Canadian commentator
Tommy Sotomayor	United States	sotomayortv2	Radio host
Rebeca Soundy	El Salvador	Becky Soundy TV, LESSAvirtual, Becky Soundy, Educasordo	Deaf culture vlogs and sign language education
Lauren Southern	Canada	Lauren Southern, LaurenSouthernLive	Alt-right commentator
Taryn Southern	United States	Hott4Hill, TarynSouthern, taryntogo	Actress, singer, model, writer, producer. Created in 2007 a Hillary Clinton campaign video, Hott4Hill.
Mary Spender	United Kingdom	Mary Spender	Musician
Eric Stanley	United States	estan247	Violinist and composer, known for remixing popular hip-hop and pop songs on the violin.
Jeffree Star	United States	jeffreestar	Beauty influencer, makeup artist, former musician, owner of JeffreeStarCosmetics.
Jack Stauber	United States	JackStauber	Musician and animator known for his song "Buttercup" and collaborations with Adult Swim.
Simon Stawski and Martina Sazunic	Canada	Eatyourkimchi, simonandmartina (2016–2020), simonandmartinabonus (2016–2020)	Canadian expatriates who became notable for promoting South Korean culture on YouTube and, later, their food and travel vlogs
Jason Steele	United States	FilmCow	Creator of the viral Charlie the Unicorn series, as well as Llamas with Hats and Detective Mittens.
Graham Stephan	United States	GrahamStephan; TheIcedCoffeeHour	Posts content about personal finance and real estate.
James Stephanie Sterling	United Kingdom, United States	Stephanie Sterling	Freelance video game journalist, critic, and pundit. Former review editor for Destructoid and author for The Escapist. Known for heavy criticism of the wider gaming industry.
Winston Sterzel	South Africa	ADVChina, serpentZA	Produces YouTube videos on life in China
Michael Stevens	United States	Vsauce	Host and creator of Vsauce, explaining topics of general interest, often including science and philosophy.
Nicholas Stewart	United States	Jynxzi, Jynxzi Live, Jynxzi VODS, Jynxzi Podcast	Gamer and livestreamer
Lindsey Stirling	United States	lindseystomp, LindseyTime	America's Got Talent quarterfinalist; known for dancing while playing violin, performing classical crossover to electronic dance music, hip-hop and dubstep; charted on Billboard.
Hannah Stocking-Siagkris	United States	Hannah Stocking	Posts comedy skits
Devin Stone	United States	LegalEagle	Practicing lawyer who comments on current affairs through a legal lens and reviews legal movies.
Matt Stonie	United States	MegatoadStonie	Known for eating challenges and comeptitive eating.
John Stossel	United States	John Stossel	Libertarian political commentator, consumer reporter, and former television journalist; known for his Stossel in the Classroom educational videos and his commentary series for Reason.
Kevin Strahle	United States	skippy62able, L.A. Beast Live	Known professionally as L.A. Beast. Competitive eater, vlogger, reviver of Crystal Pepsi
Joe Sugg	United Kingdom	ThatcherJoe, ThatcherJoeVlogs, ThatcherJoeGames	British internet personality, brother of Zoe Sugg and known for his challenges, impersonations and comedy videos.
Zoë Sugg	United Kingdom	zoella, morezoella	Her vlogs and blog posts centre around beauty, fashion and lifestyle.
Jay Swingler and Romell Henry	United Kingdom	Jay Swingler, MoreTGF, Romell Henry, TGFbro	Pranks and stunts
Sykkuno	United States	Sykkuno	Twitch streamer
Nick Symmonds	United States	nicksymmonds, NickSymmondsToo	Former professional middle-distance runner producing fitness content
T
Takanashi Kiara	Japan	Takanashi Kiara Ch. hololive-EN	A musician and VTuber associated with Hololive Production
Nyma Tang	United States	Nyma Tang	Beauty vlogger
Joe Tasker	United Kingdom	Joe Tasker	British internet personality and television presenter
James Tatro	United States	LifeAccordingToJimmy, thejimmytatrochannel	American actor, writer and YouTuber; Has made appearances in Grown Ups 2 and 22 Jump Street.
Brandon Tatum	United States	The Officer Tatum	Right-wing YouTuber and commentator
Matthew Taylor	United Kingdom	Techmoan	Known for consumer tech reviews and "RetroTech" documentaries about technology of historical interest
Amy Shira Teitel	Canada/United States	The Vintage Space	Discusses the history of space flight and exploration
Molly Templeton	Canada	mememolly	Internet personality and former presenter of Rocketboom daily news
Steve Terreberry	Canada	Steve Terreberry (SteveTerreberry), Unka Munka	Musician, singer-songwriter, comedian
Pawan Jung Shahi Thakuri	Nepal	4K Gaming Nepal	Known for his PUBG videos.
Nicki Thiim	Denmark	NickiThiim	Racecar driver
Steve Thomas	United States	Steve1989MREInfo	Military ration reviewer
Abigail Thorn	United Kingdom	Philosophy Tube	Videos usually discuss philosophy.
Adande Thorne	Trinidad and Tobago, United States	sWooZie	Animated storytelling
Daniel Thrasher	United States	Daniel Thrasher	Music, skits
Sanjay Thumma	India	Vahchef – VahRehVah	Indian culinary videos
Tay Tian	Canada	Lil Tay	Internet personality and rapper
Sergei Tikhanovsky	Belarus	Страна для жизни (in Russian)/Country for Life	Belarusian political blogger, activist, and entrepreneur. Political prisoner since 2020, shortly after stating intent to run for president in the 2020 Belarusian presidential election, for which he was succeeded by his wife Sviatlana Tsikhanouskaya.
Chloe Ting	Australia	Chloe Ting	Known for fitness videos and challenges
Simon Tofield	United Kingdom	Simon's Cat	Tofield's first video was uploaded to YouTube on 4 March 2008. Since then, in addition to making YouTube videos, he has published four books.
Tokai On Air	Japan	Tokai On Air	A Japanese YouTuber group based in Okazaki City, Aichi Prefecture, consisting of six members: Tetsuya, Ryo, Shibayu, Toshimitsu, Yumemaru, and Mushimegane.
Tokino Sora	Japan	SoraCh. ときのそらチャンネル	VTuber and founding member of Hololive Production
Jonathan Tomines	Canada	The Toe Bro	Canadian chiropodist
Tyler Toney, Coby Cotton, Cory Cotton, Garrett Hilbert, Cody Jones	United States	Dude Perfect, Dude Perfect en Español, Dude Perfect Plus, DudePerfectTV	Internet group that does various sports-related challenges.
† Tongo	Peru	Tongo Oficial	Singer, humorist and songwriter, known for mainly covering deliberately mispronounced English songs fused with cumbia, a style he calls "Tonglish".
Ryan Trahan	United States	Ryan Trahan, ryan trahan	Comedic and vlogging YouTuber
Natalie Tran	Australia	communitychannel	First Vietnamese-Australian YouTuber to pass one million subscribers.
Trial & Error	Hong Kong	試當真trialanderror	Makes comedy videos
Samuel Tsui	United States	TheSamTsui	Best known for covering and performing songs by popular artists, as well as original medleys and mashups.
Toby Turner	United States	Tobuscus, TobyTurner, TobyGames	Comedian and actor known for his "Literal Trailers", hosting CuteWinFail and playing Nerville on the Annoying Orange TV series.
Merrell Twins	United States	merrelltwins	Comedy duo, actresses, musicians and singers
Matthew Tye	United States	Laowhy86	Travel vlogger and commentator about political and social issues in China
Tobias Justin	Indonesia	Jess No Limit	Known for Mobile Legends: Bang Bang content on YouTube; former esports player.
U
Jerzy Urban	Poland	Tygodnik NIE	Comedian, political commentator.
Usada Pekora	Japan	Pekora Ch. 兎田ぺこら	VTuber associated with Hololive Production. One of the most watched female livestreamers
Cenk Uygur, John Iadarola, Ana Kasparian, Ben Mankiewicz	United States	The Young Turks, TYT Investigates, TYT's The Conversation	Left-wing online media outlet
V
Calvin Vail	United States	LeafyIsHere (terminated)	Controversial commentator
Jack Vale	United States	jackvalefilms	Hidden camera pranks on the general public.
Lyna Vallejos	Argentina	Lyna	Gamer and writer
Christiaan Van Vuuren	Australia	Van Vuuren Bros	Gained notable popularity as "The Fully Sick Rapper" after starting to record videos from within quarantine for tuberculosis.
Mikhail Varshavski	United States	Doctor Mike	Russian-born American family physician
Lizzie Velásquez	United States	Lizzie Velasquez	Author, motivational speaker
vedal987	United Kingdom	Neuro-sama, Neuro-sama Official Vods	Creator of artificial intelligence VTuber Neuro-sama.
Rion Vernon	United States	DoctorSteel	Steampunk / industrial musician, entertainer, and visual artist
Corey Vidal	Canada	Corey Vidal	Known for "Star Wars (John Williams is the Man)" and how-to dance videos.
Larry Vickers	United States	Vickers Tactical	Known for videos specializing in firearms.
Fede Vigevani	Uruguay, Mexico	Fede Vigevani	Uruguayan YouTuber and musician based in Mexico City.
Varg Vikernes	Norway	Thulean Perspective	Vlogger noted for his socially conservative views and advocacy for white nationalism, Nordicism, and traditional paganism. Best known as a Norwegian black metal musician, known for his music project Burzum and as the former bassist of Mayhem.
Tessa Violet	United States	meekakitty	American comedy vlogger
Stefan Vuksanović	Serbia	Mudja	Gamer & streamer
Aleksa Vulović	Australia	Boy Boy	Serbian-Australian comedian
Lauri and Anni Vuohensilta	Finland	Hydraulic Press Channel	Various objects are crushed by a hydraulic press.
W
Alan Walker	United Kingdom/Norway	Alan Walker, Walker Gaming	English-Norwegian DJ and record producer
Amy Walker	United States	Amy Walker	Video game voice actress, notably as Lunara in Heroes of the Storm and various characters in Fallout 76. She is also a director, singer, and artist. Most notable for videos about world accents.
Doug Walker	United States	League of Super Critics, Channel Awesome, ThatGuyWithTheGlasses	Comedian, movie reviewer and film critic, part of Channel Awesome. Creator and portrayer of That Guy With the Glasses, the Nostalgia Critic and Chester A. Bum.
Elle Walker, Meg Resnikoff, Brooke Mahan	United States	WhatsUpMoms	Three moms who post motherhood-related comedy content, although recently, other moms have been featured on it. In 2018, Brooke left, but came back in 2020. In 2020, Meg left, but came back in 2021.
D'Angelo Wallace	United States	dangelowallace, D'Angelo Wallace, Office Husband	American commentary YouTuber; notable for videos on Shane Dawson and Jeffree Star
Steve Wallis	Canada	thestevewallis	Outdoor channel primarily focused on unconventional camping methods, such as "boondocking" and "urban stealth camping"
Jeremy Wang	Canada	Disguised Toast	Gaming
Phillip Wang, Wesley Chan and Ted Fu	United States	wongfuproductions	Film-making trio. Known for film shorts, music videos for other musicians and their vlogs called "Wong Fu Weekends".
Mahoto Watanabe	Japan	Mahoto (terminated)	Japanese YouTuber and rapper
Darren Watkins Jr.	United States	IShowSpeed, Speedy Boykins, Live Speedy	YouTuber and streamer known for his variety livestreams
Alec Watson	United States	Technology Connections	Covers the history and mechanics of consumer electronics, home appliances, and other pieces of technology
Amelia Watson	Japan	Watson Amelia Ch. hololive-EN	VTuber associated with Hololive Production. Channel is inactive
Paul Joseph Watson	United Kingdom	PrisonPlanetLive	Far-right conspiracy theorist
Rebecca Watson	United States	Rebecca Watson, Rebecca Versus Life	Videos surrounding feminism, critical thinking, religious skepticism, and scientific skepticism
Catherine Wayne	United States	boxxybabee, ANewHopeee, bodaciousboxxy	Popular for her YouTube comedy videos under the pseudonym "Boxxy". Fights between her supporters and her detractors lead to an "online war".
Lauren Weber	United States	LaurenZside, LaurenzOtherSide, LaurenZside Movies,	Gaming channel most known for Minecraft and The Sims 4 content.
Jesse Wellens and Jeana Smith	United States	PrankvsPrank, BFvsGF, NylahKitty, DownRangeGaming	Couple pranking each other, as well as video logs of their daily life.
Michael Wesch	United States	mwesch	His video "Web 2.0 ... The Machine is Us/ing Us" was viewed over 11 million times.
Blaire White	United States	Blaire White, The Blaire White Project	Political commentary YouTuber, vlogger, and host of the podcast The Blaire White Project.
Charles White Jr.	United States	penguinz0, MoistCr1TiKaL Gaming	Known for his gameplay, Twitch streaming, and commentary videos, which are notably delivered in a deadpan format.
Daniel White	United States	danooct1	Demonstrates and documents computer viruses and other forms of malware
Oli White	United Kingdom	Oli White	Known for his appearance as James in the AwesomenessTV web series Shipping Julia, and for his appearance as himself in Joe and Caspar Hit The Road.
Mark Wiens	Thailand	Mark Wiens	Food and Travel YouTuber
Cory Williams	United States	SMP Films, TheMeanKitty, LiveEachDay	Known as Mr. Safety from SMP Films, organizer of the "As One" YouTube gathering
Cory DeVante Williams	United States	CoryxKenshin	Gaming content
Steven Williams	United States	boogie2988	Gaming channel primarily known for the character Francis, who gives his thoughts on and usually rages on various gaming topics.
Theodore Williams	United States	Ted Williams	Most notable for "The Man with the Golden Radio Voice".
† Lamarr Wilson	United States	Lamarr Wilson	Technology reporter, comedic presenter, and educator known as "That Unboxing Guy" and "The Tech Lifestyle Entertainer". He co-hosted the Webby Award-winning series Takei's Take with George Takei and was a regular contributor to the Daily Tech News Show.
Brando Franco Windah	Indonesia	Windah Basudara	Video game live streaming
Jeff Wittek	United States	Jeff Wittek, JEFF FM, JEFF CLIPS	Vlogger
Hannah Witton	United Kingdom	hannahgirasol	Witton creates video blogs and informational content, mostly based around relationships, sex and sexual health, liberation and welfare issues, literature, and travel.
Emi Wong	Hong Kong	EmiWong	Makes fitness, lifestyle, and travelling videos
Freddie Wong and Brandon Laatsch	United States	Rocket Jump, Brandonjla	Creator of many mini action movies. They have gained a combined total of over 9.5 million subscribers since beginning uploading videos in 2010.
Kai Wong, Alamby Leung and Lok Cheung (all former)	Hong Kong	DigitalRevCom	Presenter of DigitalRev TV
Eddie Woo	Australia	Eddie Woo	This mathematics teacher started his career in 2012 when recording a lesson for a sick student. His YouTube channel has over 1.34 million subscribers and more than 95 million views worldwide as of November 2021.
Sulhee Jessica Woo	United States	Sulhee Jessica	Korean American content creator known for bento box lunch videos; author of Let's Make Some Lunch (2024)
Scott Wozniak	United States	Scott the Woz, Scott's Stash, Scott's Snippets	Creator of comedy gaming retrospective web series Scott the Woz; in addition to YouTube, the series aired on the G4 television network.
Douglas Wreden	United States	DougDoug, DougDoug Clips, DougDougDoug, DougDougDougDoug, Friends til Death, Lemonade Stand, Lemonade Stand Clips	Known for his gaming videos which usually revolve around various challenges, as well as his charity streams for the Monterey Bay Aquarium, in which he has raised over $100,000.
Kevin Wu	United States	KevJumba, JumbaFund	Comedian/reality star of The Amazing Race 17. Formerly hosted "Flicks" pre-commercials on Cartoon Network.
Bill Wurtz	United States	bill wurtz	Video creator, animator, and musician who makes surreal videos, most notably "history of japan" and "history of the entire world, i guess".
Natalie Wynn	United States	ContraPoints	A former philosophy graduate student and instructor who creates videos about gender, race, politics.
X
Y
Ami Yamato	Japan	Ami Yamato	A VTuber vlogger
Eugene Lee Yang, Keith Habersberger, Ned Fulmer, and Zach Kornfeld	United States	The Try Guys	Known for their book The Hidden Power of F*cking Up; their YouTube Red series Squad Wars; and winning the 6th Streamy Awards award for Nonfiction Channel, Show, or Series, the 8th Streamy Awards for Show of the Year, and the 2018 Webby Awards for Unscripted (Branded) – People's Voice.
Yaorenmao	China	Yaorenmao	Chinese singer and dancer that posts videos on both Bilibili and YouTube.
Amos Yee	Singapore	BrainAndButter	Arrested after uploading a YouTube video criticizing Lee Kuan Yew shortly after the first Singaporean prime minister's death. His YouTube channel was suspended for pedophile advocacy videos, and he is currently in prison in the United States on child pornography charges.
Charlie Veitch	United Kingdom	Charles Veitch	Former conspiracy theorist, Now does walk-around tours.
Sisi Yemmie	Nigeria	SisiYemmieTV	Nigerian food and lifestyle vlogger
Viktoriya Yermolyeva	Ukraine	vkgoeswild	Pianist with over a million views who has worked with Lazar Berman and Nine Inch Nails drummer Brian Viglione.
Aaron Yonda and Matt Sloan	United States	BlameSociety	Known for the fan web series Chad Vader: Day Shift Manager.
Liah Yoo	South Korea	Liah Yoo	South Korean skincare YouTuber and entrepreneur; founder of KraveBeauty.
Chika Yoshida	Japan	cyoshida1231	Japanese YouTuber known as Bilingirl, who creates educational videos teaching English grammar and conversation
Rachel and Junichi Yoshizuki	United States/Japan	MyHusbandisJapanese	Japanese culture, society and lifestyle, cooking and culinary art
Z
Rebecca Zamolo	United States	Rebecca Zamolo, GameMaster Network	American Youtuber best known for her GameMaster Network videos, but has since moved onto challenge videos and personal life updates.
Vitaly Zdorovetskiy	United States/Russia	VitalyzdTV, VitalyzdTvSecond	Comedian and prankster
Elizabeth Zharoff	United States	The Charismatic Voice	Rock singers, reaction videos, interviews; opera.
Mark Zimmerman	Germany	ohnePixel	German gamer who plays games in the Counter-Strike series
Jake Zyrus	Philippines	charice	Filipino singer who rose to popularity through YouTube; was featured in three episodes of Glee in its second season

== See also ==
- List of most-subscribed YouTube channels
- List of most-viewed YouTube channels
- List of Internet phenomena
- Viral video
