= Melody Oliveria =

American blogger (born 1988)

- Born: August 7, 1988 (age 38); United States
- Years active: 2006–2019
- Known for: Videoblogging
- Website: bowiechick.tumblr.com

Melody Oliveria, also known by their handle bowiechick, is an American video blog contributor, most popularly to YouTube. They were listed as a notable contributor to YouTube in 2006.

== "My Webcam" video and Logitech ==
In 2006, Bowiechick posted a video titled The Breakup, in which they discusses their personal life while experimenting with web cam effects. After receiving many comments about the effects, they produced a video titled My Webcam, explaining how the effects were achieved using a Logitech Quickcam Orbit MP.

The My Webcam video is credited as doubling sales for Logitech at Amazon.com, rousing the interest of other businesses that wished to duplicate this result. Apparently, the viewer reaction was in response to the use of Logitech Video Effects in their video. Despite garnering publicity for the manufacturer, Bowiechick did not participate in a paid promotion.

== Personal life ==
As of 2018, Oliveria had gone to therapy, started a career in the nonprofit sector, and got a girlfriend.

== See also ==
- List of YouTube celebrities
