= ItsJustSomeRandomGuy =

American voice acting teacher, writer and performer

Michael Agrusso
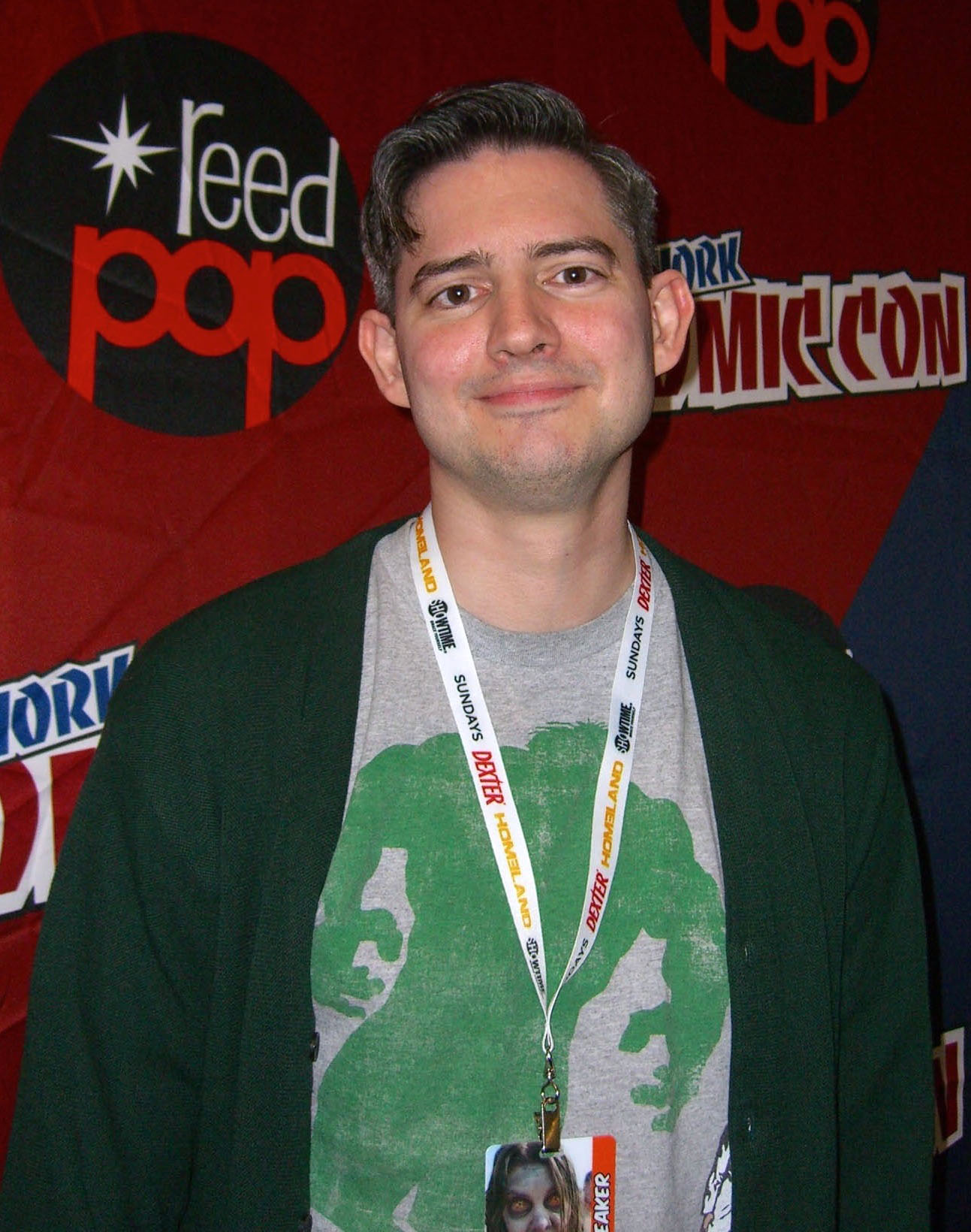
- ItsJustSomeRandomGuy creator Michael Agrusso at the 2012 New York Comic Con.
- Other name: ItsJustSomeRandomGuy
- Occupations: Voice acting teacher; writer; performer
- Known for: "Hi, I'm a Marvel...and I'm a DC"

YouTube information
- Channel: ItsJustSomeRandomGuy
- Genres: Satire; parody; commentary
- Subscribers: 164 thousand
- Views: 91 million
- Last updated: February 15, 2026

Michael Agrusso, also known as ItsJustSomeRandomGuy, is an American voice acting teacher, writer, and performer working and living in Los Angeles, California. The channel is the source of the YouTube video parody series "Hi, I'm a Marvel...and I'm a DC", which spoofs Apple's Get a Mac television commercials, known for their opening lines, "Hello, I'm a Mac..." "...And I'm a PC."

== Background ==
In late February/early March 2007, Agrusso read the Internet news that the films based on the DC Comics characters The Flash and Wonder Woman both lost their directors due to creative differences with Warner Brothers on the same day. In contrast, several future films based on Marvel Comics characters were in production. He later saw a "Get a Mac" commercial, which inspired him to parody the contrasting levels of success between Marvel and DC film productions.

== Reception and popularity ==
As of January 14, 2024, 164 thousand YouTube users were subscribed to the channel and its videos had been viewed more than 90.6 million times; the channel's first video has been viewed over 5.3 million times. An official press release by New York Comic Con via Comic Book Resources called Agrusso "a genuine Internet superstar." In July 2008, q4music.com ranked one of the channel's videos as one of the top ten YouTube videos of the month. The channel primarily discusses comic book films from the two major comic book companies (Marvel and DC) using humor. Agrusso writes, performs, and shoots his videos at home.

He uploaded his last video on April 14, 2021, and has been inactive ever since.

== See also ==
- List of YouTube celebrities
