= 4K Gaming Nepal =

Nepalese YouTuber and streamer

- Born: Pawan Jung Shahi Thakuri; 14 June 1994 (age 31); Surkhet, Nepal
- Other names: Putin
- Occupation: YouTuber

YouTube information
- Channel: 4K Gaming Nepal
- Years active: 2017–present
- Genre: Gaming
- Subscribers: 1.15 million
- Views: 112 million
- Last updated: Apr 23, 2026

Pawan Jung Shahi Thakuri (born 14 June 1994), popularly known as 4K Gaming Nepal, is a Nepalese YouTuber and streamer from Surkhet, Nepal. He publishes PUBG gameplay videos on his YouTube channel "4K Gaming Nepal". His YouTube channel has over 1 million subscribers.

== Career ==
Pawan Jung Shahi Thakuri is based in Surkhet. Popularly referred to as 4K Gaming Nepal, Pawan is mainly involved in creating Nepali-language gaming livestreams. Pawan and his team produce videos out of his home in Surkhet.

Pawan went to Korea to work at the age of 18, staying for five years. Pawan began posting PUBG videos on YouTube at the age of 19, while still in Korea. His main YouTube channel has been active since 2017. 4K Gaming Nepal's channel saw an increase in viewership during the COVID-19 lockdown in Nepal.

He has hosted charity livestreams on his channel, raising funds for oxygen cylinders due to the lack of oxygen cylinders seen during the COVID-19 epidemic in Nepal in 2021.

In 2021, Pawan left YouTube for Facebook Gaming, after Facebook offered him a partnership. He moved back to YouTube on 1 January 2023.

== See also ==
- List of YouTubers
