= Megwin =

Japanese comedian, YouTuber

- Born: Ken Sekine; 25 June 1977 (age 49); Yokosuka, Kanagawa, Japan
- Occupations: Comedian; YouTuber

YouTube information
- Channel: MegwinAI
- Years active: 2006–present
- Genre: Epical
- Subscribers: 921 thousand
- Views: 1.17 billion
- Last updated: 15 Apr 2026

Ken Sekine (関根 剣, Sekine Ken), better known by his alias Megwin, is a Japanese YouTuber and comedian. Megwin is one of YouTube Japan's most prolific YouTube bloggers, having 969,962 subscribers as of 14 June 2019. Sekine started out doing live comedy before switching to YouTube in 2005, where he has been releasing a video every day for 10 years with his various friends and workers. In 2011 he registered his own company Megwin TV Co., Ltd. (株式会社MEGWIN TV, Kabushikikaisha Meguwin Terebi). He has also partnered with the company Tanita and has held lectures on the new "Digital Hollywood". In 2013, Sekine released his first book Earning a Little on YouTube: The Master of 200 Million Views Teaches You How to Change Videos Into Money (YouTubeで小さく稼ぐ ~再生回数2億回の達人が教える、撮った動画をお金に変える方法~, Yūchūbu de Chīsaku Kasegu ~Saisei Kaisū Ni-oku-kai no Tatsujin ga Oshieru, Totta Dōga o Okane ni Kaeru Hōhō~). His channel previously consisted of four core members: Bandy, Falcon, Meteo and Megwin.

A video published to YouTube on 14 October 2018 announced that Bandy would be leaving Megwin TV. He has since started his own YouTube channel with his wife. Falcon and Meteo have also stopped appearing on Megwin TV, though there was no formal announcement of their departure. They stopped appearing in videos around December 2018. They have also started their own channel together.
