= Ren Alloy =

American comedian and actress

- Born: Karen Schindler Alloy; August 3, 1977 (age 49); Chicago, Illinois, U.S.
- Other names: spricket24; karen24alloy
- Occupations: YouTuber; comedian; entertainer
- Years active: 2006–present

YouTube information
- Channel: Ren Alloy
- Genres: Comedy; vlogging; commentary
- Subscribers: 201 thousand
- Views: 5.33 million
- Last updated: March 21, 2026

Karen Schindler "Ren" Alloy (born August 3, 1977) is an American comedian best known for her work on YouTube under the alias, spricket24.

== Career ==
In 2009, the National Academy of Television Arts and Sciences – one of the three governing bodies that provide Emmy Awards – awarded Alloy a Regional Emmy in the Advanced Media Writer category, the first time an award had been given in this category, for her video 2012: The End of The World. Alloy was the first person to win an Emmy for a YouTube video. She accepted the award from the Upper Midwest Chapter of the National Academy of Television Arts and Sciences at a ceremony held on January 21, 2010.
