= Dice stacking =

Performance art involving dice

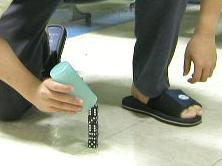
A dice stacker demonstrating stacking five dice.

Dice stacking is a performance art, akin to juggling or sleight-of-hand, in which the performer scoops dice off a flat surface with a dice cup and then sets the cup down while moving it in a pattern that stacks the dice into a vertical column via centripetal force and inertia. Various dice arrangements, colors of dice, scooping patterns and props allow for many degrees of complexity and difficulty. Dice stacking is usually performed with canceled casino dice, as their square edges and heavy weight give them an advantage when being stacked.

In Germany, the first national dice stacking championship tournament took place in May 2008. Tournament rules included the use of a special designed DiceBoard for players which shows the different prescribed moves. There are two disciplines: the "full-area" discipline and the "speed-area" discipline.

Three of the most common dice stacks are the normal stack, the fast stack, and the point stack.

== See also ==
- Sport stacking
