= Abdullah Alghafis =

Saudi YouTuber

Abdullah Alghafis is a Saudi YouTuber. He posts about digital technology and makes content related to consumer electronics. He is also the founder of a technology website Newtech based in Saudi Arabia.

Alghafis made a YouTube channel about digital technology in 2011. His content revolves around mobile applications and features and specifications of technology gadgets. He collaborated with various tech companies including Honour.

He was also selected as the ambassador in the Middle East. He is the founder of a technology website Newtech, that publishes news and information related to digital and consumer electronics. Saudi news outlets have reported on his participation in technology and related events, workshops and product launches.
