= Charith N. Silva =

Sri Lankan celebrity chef and YouTube personality

- Born: 1996 (age 29–30); Balapitiya, Sri Lanka
- Occupations: Chef; Content creator; Entrepreneur
- Years active: 2020–present
- Known for: Wild Cookbook (YouTube channel)

Charith N. Silva (born c. 1996) is a Sri Lankan celebrity chef, digital content creator, and entrepreneur. He is the founder of the YouTube channel Wild Cookbook, which features traditional Sri Lankan and fusion cuisine prepared in outdoor, rustic settings. In 2025, he became the first Sri Lankan creator to surpass 10 million subscribers on YouTube, receiving the country's first Diamond Play Button.

== Early life and career ==
Silva was born and raised in the coastal village of Balapitiya, Sri Lanka, as the youngest of four children. He was educated in his hometown before pursuing a career in the culinary arts. Inspired by his brother-in-law, a chef in Dubai, Silva initially worked in hotel kitchens, including an apprenticeship at Citrus Waskaduwa and positions at Araliya Green City and Araliya Unawatuna.

== Wild Cookbook ==
In 2020, during the COVID-19 pandemic, He launched the YouTube channel Wild Cookbook. His content is characterized by immersive cinematography, focusing on outdoor cooking using wood fires and natural ingredients. Despite early challenges, including an injury while filming near waterfalls and pandemic-related movement restrictions, the channel's aesthetic of "wild cooking" gained a massive global following.

By March 2025, Wild Cookbook reached 10 million subscribers and over 4 billion views, making it the largest YouTube channel in Sri Lanka. As of mid-2025, his social media presence also included 4.6 million followers on TikTok and 2.3 million on Instagram.

== Business ventures ==
In November 2024, Silva opened his first physical restaurant, Wildish, located at Capitol TwinPeaks in Slave Island, Colombo. The restaurant serves a fusion of traditional Sri Lankan and international dishes, intended to translate the digital brand's identity into a dining experience.

== Awards and recognition ==
- Forbes 30 Under 30 Asia (2025): Named in "The Arts" category.
- YouTube Diamond Play Button (2025): First recipient in Sri Lanka.
- Sri Lanka Youth Awards (2022): Best Youth Chef of the Year.
- Business World International Social Media Award (2025): For digital content excellence.
