= Yaorenmao =

Chinese singer and dancer

Yaorenmao 咬人猫
- Born: China

Bilibili information
- Channel: =咬人猫=
- Years active: 2011–present
- Genres: Dancing, cosplay
- Followers: 4.29 million

YouTube information
- Channel: 咬人猫Yaorenmao
- Years active: 2011–present
- Genres: Dancing, cosplay
- Subscribers: 901 thousand
- Views: 139 million
- Last updated: 23 April 2026

Yaorenmao (咬人猫; literally "a cat that bites") is a Chinese singer and dancer who primarily posts videos on Bilibili, but also on YouTube. In most (but not all) of her videos, she dances to Asian pop songs in cosplay costumes. In nearly all videos, a stuffed teddy bear is seen in one or more scenes. She has been the lead singer in several songs, including du du du, Telepathy and xiàrì néngliàng zhùrù! (夏日能量注入！)

She began making videos in 2011, which has for a great deal contained elaborate cosplays. As such, she has been described as part of the zhaiwu trend, a Chinese adaption of the Japanese otaku culture. In June 2017, she performed and acted as a judge in a zwaihu dancing competition which was held at the Communication University of Zhejiang. The event, sponsored by "manhua.163.com" and a subsidiary to Huawei, had around 300 contestants and over 1 million people registered online that they would attend the event. She also performed at the Bilibili Macro Link event in 2017, an annual concert at which famous Billibili profiles perform. In an article from 2018, it was stated she was ranked highly by Niconico users on a top list of creators that users wanted to meet.

In a 2017 interview, she declined to reveal her real name, and she also stated that she had a full-time job alongside her online dancing career.

Over time, the production values of her videos have reached a professional level, including choreography, costumes, sets, location shoots, lighting and extra background players.
