= Deng Haiyan =

Chinese-born American YouTuber and writer (born 1978)

- 邓海燕
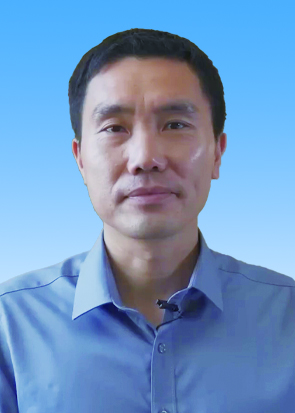
- Deng Haiyan
- Born: October 24, 1978 (age 47); Bijie, Guizhou Province, China
- Other name: Second Elder Uncle (二大爷)
- Education: People's Public Security University of China
- Occupations: YouTuber; writer; political commentator

YouTube information
- Channel: 二大爷
- Years active: 2020–present
- Genres: History; politics; documentary
- Subscribers: 1.03 million
- Views: 189 million
- Last updated: April 8, 2026

Deng Haiyan (Chinese: 邓海燕; pinyin: Dèng Hǎiyàn; born October 24, 1978), pen name Second Elder Uncle (Chinese: 二大爷; pinyin: Èrdàye), is a U.S.-based Chinese YouTuber, writer and political commentator, whose short films and articles are mainly about current political issues, the history of the Chinese Communist Party (CCP), and modern Chinese history.

Previously, he was a CCP member and a police officer working in Huangpu District, Guangzhou, Guangdong Province. In 2019, the local authorities expelled him from the CCP and public posts.

== Biography ==
Born into a military family in Bijie, Guizhou Province, Deng Haiyan graduated from the People's Public Security University of China.

After university, he became a criminal policeman, working in Huangpu District, Guangdong, Guangzhou Province.

Since 2010, he has published articles under several pen names and adopted the pen name of Second Elder Uncle in 2016.

In 2018, he attracted the attention of the Communist authorities and was harassed fourteen times with his home ransacked twice. In October 2019, he was expelled from the CCP and public posts.

In late 2019, Deng emigrated to Los Angeles, the United States, and founded the YouTube channel Stories of Second Elder Uncle (二爷故事).
