= OCR Kings =

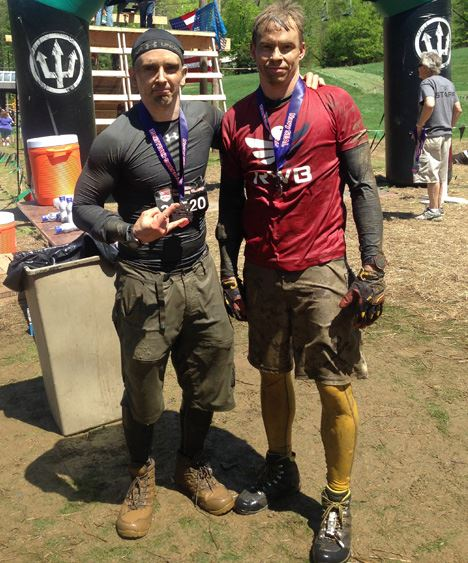
- OCR Kings, Mack and Damer.
- Born: Danbury, Connecticut, U.S.
- Occupation: YouTuber
- Years active: 2015–present

YouTube information
- Channel: OCRKings
- Genre: Sports
- Subscribers: 22.2 thousand
- Views: 7.84 million
- Last updated: 8 November 2024
- Website: www.ocrkings.com

The OCR Kings, extreme athletes "Mack (a martial arts instructor) and Damer (a semi-pro lacrosse player)" based in Danbury, Connecticut "attempt to dominate in the world of obstacle course racing by recreating the grueling challenges and obstacles of actual OCR's and developing the best methods of conquering them." The OCR Kings' stated mission is helping others to succeed in their fitness journey, especially in running and Obstacle Course Racing. They vow "to encourage and/or assist anyone, regardless of age or level of athleticism."

The OCR Kings produce obstacle race video content leveraging YouTube and other social media platforms. They are described as "the missing link between average joe's and elite" competitive racers, by producing race and mud run video content, tutorials, virtual races, and gear reviews for participants of all experience levels.

"We set out to find the best ways to compete in OCR's, like Spartan Race, Tough Mudder, and Warrior Dash, by creating our own course in the backwoods, after work, at night, after the kids are in bed. Then we film and share what we learn," says Mack. When describing their approach, Damer states that "everybody likes to know what they're up against ahead of time. We'll show you how to survive an OCR from the start line, to the free beer at the end of the course."

== Marathons and Ultras ==
The OCR Kings also provide first person view (FPV) accounts of long-distance events such as Marathons and Ultramarathons. They provide detailed accounts of what it is like to a participate in events such as the New York City Marathon and the Spartan Race Ultra, how to train for them, and what to expect during and after the race.

== Members ==
- Mack
- Damer

== Videos ==
- Spartan Race Ultra Beast All Obstacles
- Tough Mudder Half All Obstacles
- Spartan Super All Obstacles
- Savage Race All Obstacles
- Spartan Race Citi Field All Obstacles
- Warrior Dash All Obstacles
- Rugged Maniac All Obstacles
- Bone Frog Challenge All Obstacles
- OCR Training Multi Rig
- OCR Training Rope Traverse
- OCR Training Rope Climbing
- OCR Training Wall Obstacles
- New York City Marathon FPV
