= Maddie Lymburner =

Canadian fitness blogger (born 1995)

MadFit
- Born: Maddie Lymburner; 1995 (age 30–31)
- Occupations: YouTuber; Fitness coach; businesswoman

YouTube information
- Channel: MadFit
- Years active: 2018-present
- Genres: Fitness; Exercise
- Subscribers: 11.1 million
- Views: 1.54 billion
- Last updated: January 26 2026
- Website: maddielymburner.co

Maddie Lymburner (born 1995) is a Canadian fitness blogger who posts exercise videos to her YouTube channel, MadFit. As of January 2026, the channel has over 11.1 million subscribers, making it one of the most popular channels in Canada. In 2020, Google named Lymburner the top Canadian YouTube creator, as well as the top breakout Canadian YouTube creator.

Lymburner grew up in Waterdown, Ontario (now Hamilton, Ontario). Prior to starting the MadFit channel, Lymburner worked at a health food store and was a competitive dancer. She began taking dance lessons when she was three years old and danced competitively for seventeen years in various styles, including tap, jazz, and pointe. In 2015, she began posting videos about vegan recipes and cooking. She continued food vlogging during vacations abroad in 2016, at which point she reached 50,000 subscribers. She began the MadFit channel in 2018. During the COVID-19 pandemic, her viewership and subscribers increased, which she attributed to the closure of gyms causing more people to seek at-home workouts.

For her contributions to fitness and dance through her YouTube channel, she won a Webby Award in 2025.
