= Nurse Even =

Filipino nurse, comedian and content creator

- Born: John Steven Soriano; July 22, 1992 (age 34); La Union, Philippines
- Other name: Nurse Even

Comedy career
- Medium: Online, stand-up
- Subject: Healthcare worker's experiences

Instagram information
- Page: John Steven Soriano
- Genre: Comedy
- Followers: 298K

TikTok information
- Page: Nurse Even
- Genre: Comedy
- Followers: 1.4 million
- Last updated: November 10, 2026

John Steven Soriano, professionally known as Nurse Even, is a Filipino nurse, comedian and digital content creator based in the United Kingdom. He became known for social media videos depicting the experiences of nurses and other healthcare workers, particularly during the COVID-19 pandemic.

== Career ==
Soriano worked as a nurse in the Philippines before moving to the United Kingdom to continue his nursing career. He said that compensation and employment benefits were among the factors that influenced his decision to work abroad.

He began creating comedy videos inspired by his experiences in the nursing profession. His content featured humorous portrayals of hospital situations, including interactions between nurses, doctors and patients, as well as issues concerning healthcare workers' salaries and working conditions.

His videos gained popularity during the COVID-19 pandemic, attracting an online audience that included healthcare professionals and members of the Filipino community. His followers became known as "Kunars".

In November 2024, GMA Network featured Soriano in a profile about his online popularity and the development of his content creation career.

== Advocacy ==
Soriano has used comedy to draw attention to issues affecting Filipino nurses, including low compensation, inadequate staffing and workplace conditions.

In August 2022, he joined British-Filipino nurse May Parsons in calling for better treatment and pay for Filipino nurses. Soriano expressed his views through a parody video addressing the challenges faced by healthcare workers, including staffing shortages and difficult working conditions.

== Live performances ==
Soriano expanded his online comedy work into live performances. His material continued to focus on the experiences of Filipino nurses and overseas Filipino workers.

In August 2026, he undertook his first Australian tour, performing in Sydney, Melbourne, Brisbane and Perth. The tour was covered by SBS Filipino, which also featured his reflections on the challenges of nursing and the role of comedy in bringing healthcare workers together.

In November 2026, Soriano performed in the United Arab Emirates as part of his Around the Ward: The Most Toxic Shift Show tour. The performances were scheduled in Abu Dhabi on November 7 at Bab Al Qasr Hotel & Residences and in Dubai on November 8 at Sheikh Rashid Auditorium in Oud Metha.

The Abu Dhabi performance was reported sold out five days before the scheduled event. The Dubai performance was also promoted as part of the two-city UAE engagement.
