= Topper Guild =

American YouTuber (born 2002)

- Born: August 21, 2002 (age 24); San Francisco
- Citizenship: United States
- Education: Cosumnes Oaks High School

YouTube information
- Channel: Topper Guild
- Years active: 2014–present
- Genres: Comedy; Entertainment; Vlog
- Subscribers: 94.6 million
- Views: 35.4 billion
- Last updated: 26 September 2026

Topper Guild (born August 21, 2002) is an American YouTuber and social media personality. As of July 2026, he is the 20th-biggest YouTube channel in the world with 94.6 million subscribers.

Guild's videos primarily feature pranks and challenges and use a fast-paced style of editing. His content has drawn comparisons to MrBeast, with Sherwood News describing Guild as having imitated MrBeast's style, including recreating his videos. This style, known as "retention editing", became widespread on YouTube, TikTok and Instagram during the early 2020s

== Early life and education ==
Topper Guild was born in San Francisco on August 21, 2002, and grew up in Elk Grove, California. He went to high school at the Cosumnes Oaks High School, where he was on the basketball team.

== Career ==
=== Contracts ===
In August 2025, he signed a contract with the WME.

In October 2025, he signed a deal with Pocket.watch for them to air his videos in 2026.

== Personal life ==
Guild is based in Elk Grove. He is the younger brother of internet entrepreneur Adam Guild, who is the co-founder and CEO of Owner.com.

== See also ==
- List of most-subscribed YouTube channels
