= Você Sabia? =

Brazilian YouTube channel

- Channel Logo

YouTube information
- Years active: 2013-present
- Genre: Vlog

"Você Sabia?" ("Did You Know?" in literal translation) is a Brazilian YouTube channel focusing on entertainment and curiosities created on September 1, 2013, hosted by Lukas Marques and Daniel Molo. "Você Sabia?" features edutainment videos such as theories, mysteries, trivia, and other topics. The creators also maintain a secondary channel called "Você Sabia GAMES."

In the past, the channel had numerous features, such as "VS10", "Você Sabia Porque" ("Did you know why?"), "VSNews", and others. However, the channel currently has only two regular series, "VSResponde" (Q&A series) and "Você Sabia? Retrô".

In 2017, the project gave rise to the book "Você Sabia? + de 400 Coisas Que Você Deveria Saber" ("Did You Know? 400+ Things You Should Know").

Although educational, the channel has been the subject of several controversies and criticisms, due to the fact that some of its old videos are not considered politically correct.

As of October 1st, 2023, the channel is the 55th most-subscribed YouTube channel in the world with 44.9 million subscribers.

== Second channel ==
On April 10, 2014, YouTubers Lukas Marques and Daniel Mologni created a secondary channel called "Você Sabia PLUS" (later renamed "Você Sabeia GAMES"), to focus on game curiosities, but the channel ended up bringing together various subjects, such as videos from daily life vlogs, gameplays, and other themes. Most of the videos are focused on curiosities and facts related to the gamer world. The channel is updated less frequently than the main channel.

== History ==
In the beginning, Lukas Marques and Daniel Mologni had a blog together, called "Calma, Cara" ("Calm Down, Dude" in literal translation), which gathered daily news. After high school, Daniel Mologni and Lukas Marques went their separate ways but reunited after two years at a YouPIX event. Initially, videos were recorded remotely and combined during editing. As the channel grew, the duo relocated to São Paulo where the production became more professionalized.

On December 31, 2020, Lukas Marques and Daniel Mologni posted the video "THANK YOU SO MUCH FOR 2020 and a GREAT 2021 TO ALL!!," announcing that they would be taking a break from YouTube and reuploading old videos from the channel under the new title, "Você Sabia? Retrô". The first video of the series was posted on 12 January 2021.

== Controversies ==
In 2017, the newspaper Folha de S.Paulo published an article revealing that the channel Você Sabia? had received 65 thousand reais from the Ministry of Education to promote the proposal for the New High School. The article also pointed out that the channel had not disclosed that the content was sponsored advertising. Subsequently, Folha published another article highlighting offensive and prejudiced posts made by YouTuber Lukas Marques on his Twitter account in 2014, targeting blacks, women, and gays. These revelations sparked strong controversy, leading to a significant loss of subscribers for the channel and the suspension of video uploads by other YouTubers associated with the channel.

== Awards ==
Year	Award	Category	Result	Ref.
2017	My Nick Awards 2017	Favorite YouTube channel	Nominated	
2018	My Nick Awards 2018	Favorite YouTube channel	Nominated	
2019	My Nick Awards 2019	Favorite YouTube channel	Won	
2020	Digital Influencers Award	Knowledge and Curiosities	Nominated	
