= Campbell Hall School =

Private school in Los Angeles, California, US

Campbell Hall

Location
- 4533 Laurel Canyon Boulevard; Studio City, Los Angeles, California 91607; United States; 34.15283°N 118.39730°W

Information
- Type: Private, day school
- Motto: Latin: Ne Obliviscaris (Do Not Forget)
- Religious affiliation: Episcopal
- Established: 1944; 82 years ago
- Founder: Alexander Kirk Campbell
- CEEB code: 052133
- Teaching staff: 164.1 (FTE) (2017–18)
- Grades: K–12
- Gender: Coeducational
- Enrollment: 1,131 (2017–18)
- Average class size: 15
- Student to teacher ratio: 6.9:1 (2017–18)
- Colors: Navy blue Gold
- Athletics conference: CIF Southern Section; Gold Coast League
- Nickname: Vikings
- Newspaper: The Piper
- Yearbook: Caledonian
- Tuition: K-6: $46,160; 7-12: $54,100 (2025-26)
- Website: www.campbellhall.org

Campbell Hall School is an independent, coeducational, Episcopal, K–12 day school in the Studio City neighborhood of Los Angeles, California, United States. Founded in 1944 by the Reverend Alexander Campbell, the school has an enrollment of approximately 1,000 students from kindergarten through high school. It has programs in athletics, music, drama, dance, and all other major academic areas. The school features a developed Performing Arts Program. Students in kindergarten through grade 12 participate in dance, voice, instrumental, and drama programs. Orchestra and a World Music Program are available for grades 7–12.

== History ==
The school opened in 1944 as a kindergarten to sixth-grade school at the St. David's Parish Sunday School building at 4343 Radford Avenue in Studio City. It moved to its current site in the 1945–46 school year. It gradually expanded to include junior high school, a girls' high school, and the acceptance of boys for all levels in the mid-1980s. The Fourth R, a film made in the late 1940s, explains the founding of the school based on a need for religion in the daily education of the school's students. The chapel program continues this tradition. Since its founding, Campbell Hall School has had three headmasters: Alexander Campbell, the founder; Thomas G. Clarke, who served for 32 years; and, since July 2003, Julian Bull.

== Tuition ==
Tuition for the 2026–2027 school year is $48,700 (elementary school; grades K–5), $52,890 (grade 6), $57,080 (grades 7–12). Over $3,000,000 of Campbell Hall's $26,000,000 budget is dedicated to financial aid, although much of this is used to attract diversity and student athletes. Twenty-five percent of enrolled students receive grants averaging 50% of the cost of tuition. The remaining money for financial aid comes from the school's endowment.

== Notable alumni ==
- Paul Thomas Anderson, director
- Annalise Basso, actress
- Simone Battle, singer
- Troian Bellisario, actress
- Max Burkholder, actor
- Sophia Chitlik, politician
- Jordan Cohen, Israeli Basketball Premier League player
- Josh Cuevas, NFL player
- Zoey Deutch, actress
- Dakota Fanning, actress
- Elle Fanning, actress
- Colin Ford, actor
- Topper Guild, YouTuber
- Aaron Holiday, NBA player
- Jrue Holiday, NBA player
- Justin Holiday, NBA player
- Austin McBroom, college basketball player, YouTuber (The Ace Family)
- Ashley Olsen, actress, fashion designer
- Elizabeth Olsen, actress
- Mary-Kate Olsen, actress, fashion designer
- Nick Robinson, actor
- Michael Matteo Rossi, filmmaker
- John David Washington, actor
- Ariel Winter, actress
