= Biju =

Biju (Malayalam: ബിജു) is a male given name and surname in India, especially in Bengal, Orissa, and Kerala. It is also found in Bangladesh, where the name means "second son".

Biju is derived from the similar rhyming name Viju. It is highly likely that Viju is an affectionate version of the name Vijaya, which means Victory in Sanskrit and several Indian languages. It has a similar meaning in Chinese as well. Biju is associated with Arjuna, the great warrior hero of the Mahabharatha.

In Kerala, the name Biju is used by all communities: Hindus, Christians, and Muslims, and thus is a secular name, although many have added suffixes which indicate their caste or community.

This name also may have derived from the French word "bijou" (pronounced "bizhu"), meaning "jewel."

== People with the given name ==
- Biju Mathew (fl. 1998–present), American Marxist intellectual
- Biju Menon (born 1970), Indian film actor
- Biju Sopanam (born 1970), Indian television and film actor
- Biju Narayanan (fl. 1992–present), Indian playback singer
- Biju Kuttan (born 1976), Indian actor and comedian
- Biju Patnaik (1916–1997), Indian politician, founder of Biju Janata Dal party
- Biju Phukan (1947–2017), Indian Assamese actor
- Biju Toppo (fl. 1995–present), Indian documentary filmmaker
- Biju Viswanath (fl. 1998–present), Indian film director
- Bijukumar Damodaran, known as Dr. Biju (born 1971), Indian film director

== People with the surname ==
- Sathyabhama Das Biju (born 1963), Indian biologist
- P K Biju (born 1974), Indian politician and former member of the Indian Parliament
- KL Bro Biju, an Indian YouTuber known for his YouTube channel, KL BRO Biju Rithvik

== See also ==
- Biju Patnaik University of Technology, a public state university in Rourkela, Odisha, India
- Biju Janata Dal, an Indian regional political party in the state of Odisha
- Biju Patnaik Airport, an international airport serving Bhubaneswar, the capital city of Odisha, India
- Action Hero Biju, a 2016 Indian Malayalam-language film by Abrid Shine
