= Modesti =

Modesti is an Italian surname. Notable people with the surname include:

- Giuseppe Modesti (1915–1998), Italian opera singer
- Maximo Modesti (born 1952), Argentine sport shooter

== See also ==
- Modesto (surname)
