= Badabun =

Mexican YouTube channel

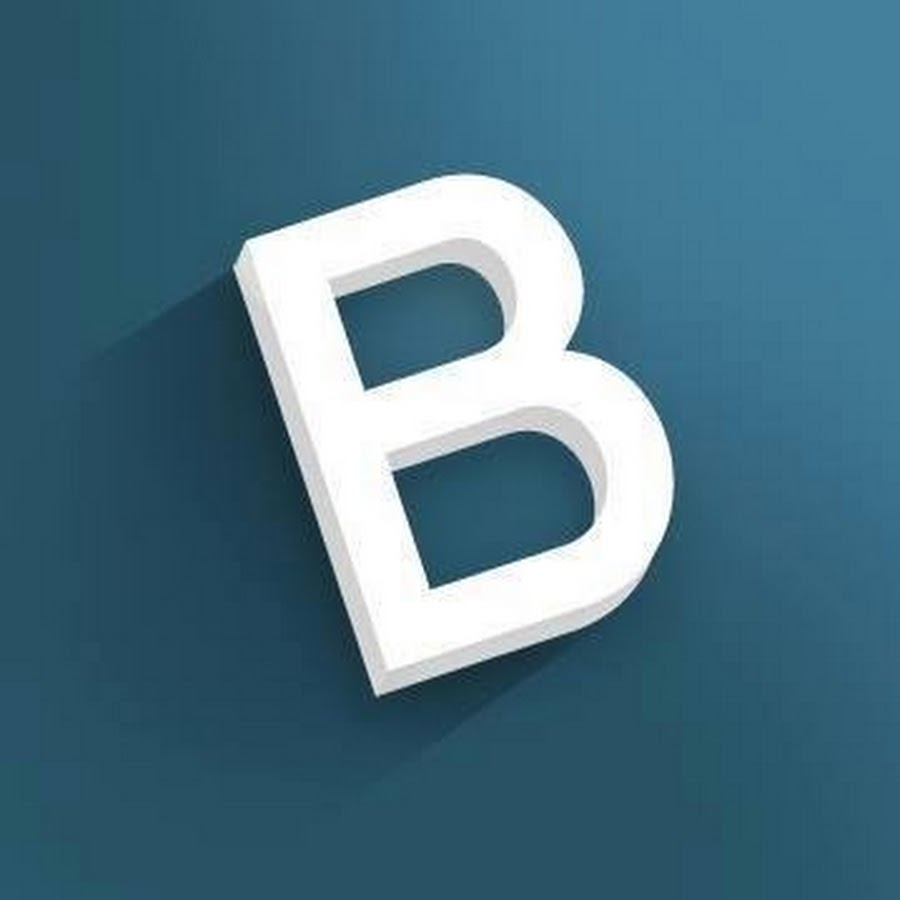
- Channel image used until mid or late 2023.

YouTube information
- Channel: Badabun
- Years active: 2014–present
- Subscribers: 47.6 million
- Views: 20.1 billion
- Last updated: March 10, 2026
- Website: badabun.com

Creación y Difusión de Contenido Web S.A. de C.V. d/b/a Badabun is a Mexican audiovisual production company that creates digital content, primarily on YouTube. Badabun began in 2014 as a YouTube channel that uploaded videos such as top-ten lists and "street surveys" of members of the public, which often contained an element of humor. In subsequent years, Badabun rapidly rose in popularity as many Internet celebrities shared and discussed its content. It has created several video series, including Atrapando infieles, Entrevistamos A, Mansión del influencer, and Exponiendo infieles, the last of which is one of their most popular productions. They have had internet personalities such as Alex Flores, Daniel Alfaro, and Lizbeth Rodríguez partner with their channel. In the 2019 edition of YouTube's video series YouTube Rewind, Badabun was listed as the most popular Spanish-language channel on the site.

Badabun has received a lot of criticism, because their content has been described as "sensationalistic" and "false", and because Badabun employees have come forward with allegations of workplace harassment, sexual harassment, and homophobia within the company.

== History ==
We were studying at the Law School of the Autonomous University of Baja California (UABC) when we thought of an innovative application that, by using it, could locate you through geolocation and get a lawyer registered with us to answer questions about a legal case. But they did not believe in the project, we had no money, and no one trusted that the internet would become what it is now.

— César Morales in Vice Magazine

Badabun was founded in 2010 by six law students from the Autonomous University of Baja California, including Ever Rafael Bojórquez Ibarra, Lizbeth Elorza Soriano, Marco Antonio Zuno Sierra, Ricardo Morales Jimenez and the former CEO of the company, César Morales Jimenez. Originally, they were considering creating a mobile app that would allow users to locate lawyers via geolocation in order to have their questions about legal issues answered, which the creators dubbed "an Uber for lawyers". However, the project failed due to a lack of funds and interest. Three years later, Morales was creating a blog about historical events, which did not interest viewers. His first post to become viral was an article titled "Seven things you didn't know about El Chapo". Soon, some of his other articles also became successful. During that time, the Badabun company was focused on helping users monetize Facebook pages, and teaching them how to earn money online. In spite of this, the founders noticed that their videos tended to gain more attention than the articles, and in 2015 they decided to exclusively generate video content. Shortly after the site began to obtain attention online, radio host Víctor González joined the Badabun team, becoming the new face of the company's channel.

Their YouTube channel was created in October 2014, and their first video titled "Ten qualities that every man seeks in a woman" was published on 5 December of the same year. Their early videos discussed interesting curiosities, tricks, experiments, and other general viral content. In December 2016, when the channel reached one million subscribers, the channel's content continued in the same direction, but with the addition of "street surveys" where Badabun interviewed members of the public. By the end of the following year, they had five million subscribers, and premiered their series Exponiendo infieles, which led to an even stronger growth in popularity and became a prominent production by the company. Other productions include Mansión del influencer, a program reminiscent of reality TV, where Internet celebrities interact with each other in a mansion; the comedy series WTF Comedy; interview show Entrevistamos a; and the series Qué pasaría si..., where they explain the consequences of hypothetical events.

In January 2019, Badabun's YouTube channel surpassed the YouTube channel elrubiusOMG in the number of subscribers, becoming the second-most subscribed Spanish-language channel, behind Chilean channel HolaSoyGerman. In April of the same year Badabun surpassed HolaSoyGerman in terms of subscribers, becoming the most subscribed Spanish-language channel on YouTube before being surpassed by Argentine channel El Reino Infantil in August 2021. In December 2019, in the video YouTube Rewind 2019: For the Record, the tenth edition of YouTube Rewind, the channel was highlighted as the most-subscribed channel in the Spanish-speaking world.

== Criticism and controversies ==
=== Super Mario Bros. speedrun ===
In December 2017, Badabun uploaded a video purportedly showing Tavo Betancourt, a member of Badabun, speedrunning Super Mario Bros. in just over 5 minutes. In January 2020, YouTuber Karl Jobst uploaded a video revealing that the speedrun had been faked. In his video, Jobst provides video evidence, including various inconsistencies and irregularities found within Betancourt's gameplay footage, in order to demonstrate Badabun's video was created using stolen footage from other speedruns as well as from world records set by players Kosmic and Darbian, and some tool-assisted speedruns.

=== Sensationalized content ===
Ever since Badabun has received wider media coverage, they have been a target of criticism and involved in many controversies. One of the main criticisms towards the company is about their use of clickbait in their content, and their usage of unreliable content. Their series Exponiendo infieles was accused of being fraudulent by the public on several occasions, alleging that the participants were hired to fake infidelity. In December 2019, Lucas Petroni, a former member of the production, said that the company originally hired him for an episode of the series. In addition, he said that his engagement with fellow former production member Daniela "Queen" Buenrostro was made up by the company.

=== Workplace harassment ===
On 6 December 2019, former team employees Alex Flores, Dani Alfaro, Daniela "Queen" Buenrostro, Kevin Achutegui, and Kim Shantal, together with the YouTuber Juan De Dios Pantoja, posted a video denouncing the workplace harassment, sexual harassment, and homophobia they had suffered through while working with the company, specifically on the part of CEO César Morales. In the 37-minute long video, they recounted suffering through an exploitative and toxic work environment that forced them to work up to twenty hours a day to create content, and forced them to do things against their will, such as faking rescue situations, giving gifts to people, and forming romantic relationships with each other, in order to gain a larger audience. They alleged that they were forced to sign restrictive contracts in which they gave up control over everything they do, including giving control of their social media accounts to the company. The former employees also stated that they were victims of verbal abuse, especially the women, who were insulted "for their own good". They did not place much emphasis on the cases of sexual harassment and homophobia during the video. Days after the complaint, former employee Daniela Lorea published a video accusing Morales of sexual harassment, and YouTuber Carolina Díaz stated in an Instagram live stream that she had also been harassed and sexually assaulted by Morales. Following this, Badabun confirmed that Morales would be dismissed from the position on 11 December.

=== Artist layoffs ===
On 15 December 2019, Morales was interviewed on Víctor González's YouTube channel. He stated that money and problems involving Juan De Dios Pantoja triggered the situation. The year before, Pantoja and the Badabun team created the Jukidog channel, which gained millions of subscribers over a few months. Badabun would handle investments, and Pantoja would oversee distribution and advertising. Approximately three million Mexican pesos were invested in the project, but it ended up not meeting expectations. In a subsequent meeting with all of the company's YouTubers, the decision was made that the art team would no longer be necessary. Morales opposed the layoff, and proposed having the art team use Jukidog to create more content, with the possibility of it generating enough income for their salaries. He said that Pantoja was disgruntled by the decision, and that he would later post a flurry of claims about the company through social media. Regarding the accusations, he said: "Guys, it would be good for you to accept that everything you said was made up, and that lies will not get you anywhere; you should be honest and tell the truth. If any there were any crimes, I invite you to go to the ministry and report it". Lizbeth Rodríguez spoke out against Badabun stating she would no longer continue to work with the company.

=== Ties with Citizens' Movement ===
Since at least 2022, Badabun has been associated with Citizens' Movement. Several videos made in 2022 and 2023 positively promoting the image of Samuel García, Governor of Nuevo León, and his wife Mariana Rodríguez were posted on Badabun's social accounts. According to a report, Badabun has been in an "open contract" with the state of Nuevo León since July 2022, the cost of each video was over $125000 MXN (roughly US$7320). In 2024, a video was posted where Jorge Máynez, a candidate for the 2024 Mexican presidential election, and García, were drinking alcohol, insulting various politicians and the National Electoral Institute. After the video surfaced, various reuploads of the video were deleted using the DMCA on Badabun's behalf. Both Máynez and Badabun have denied any sort of involvement with each other.

== See also ==
- List of most-subscribed YouTube channels
