= Vlad A4 =

Belarusian YouTuber (born 1996)

Vladislav Bumaga
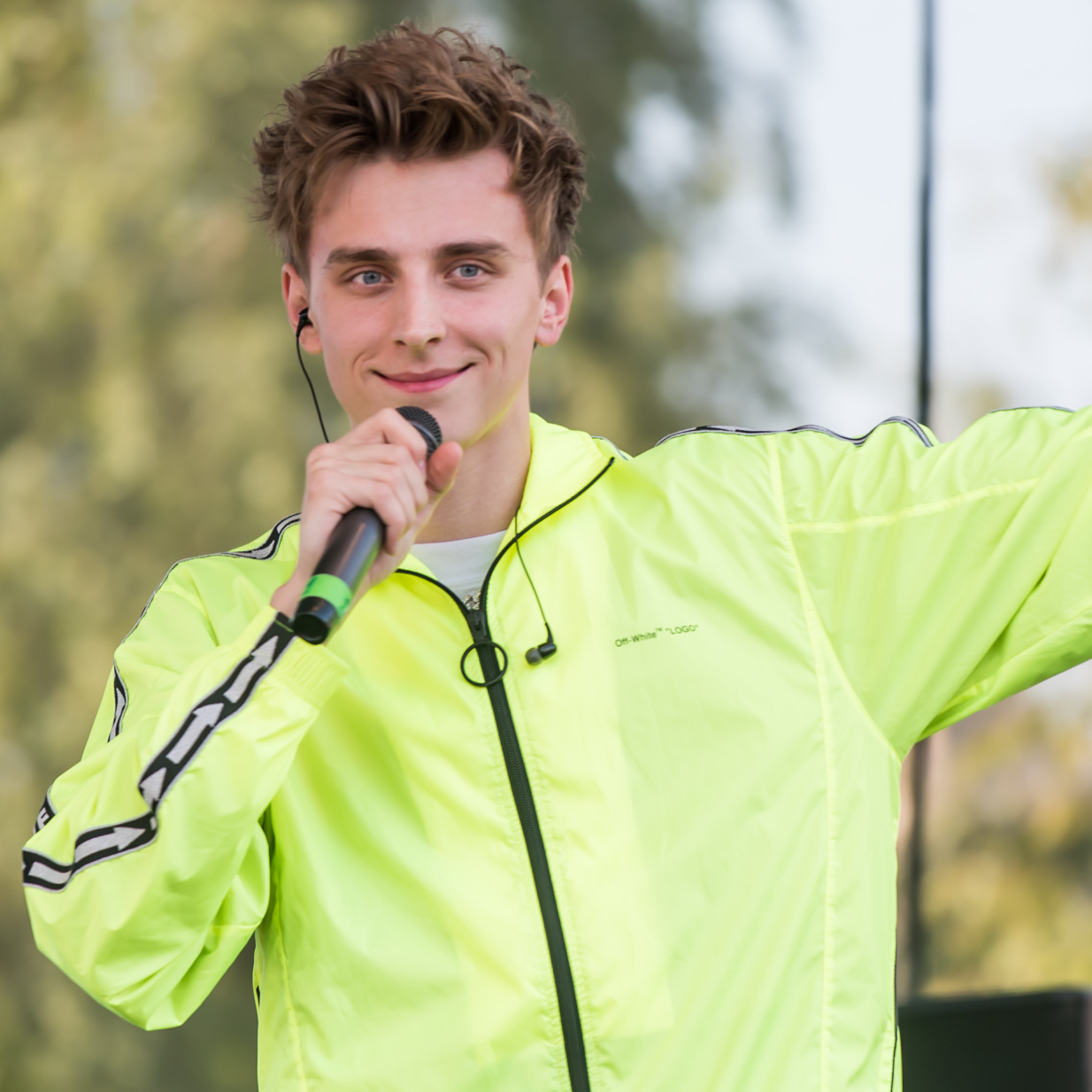
- Bumaga at VK Fest 2019
- Born: Uladzislaŭ Andrejevič Bumaha; 5 June 1996 (age 30); Minsk, Belarus
- Other name: Vlad A4, A4
- Occupations: YouTuber; Singer

YouTube information
- Channel: A4
- Years active: 2014–present
- Genres: Vlog; Comedy
- Subscribers: 92.7 million
- Views: 37.96 billion
- Last updated: 11 September 2026
- Website: a4shop.ru

Vladislav Andreyevich Bumaga (Russian: Владислав Андреевич Бумага) or Uladzislau Andreyevich Bumaha (Belarusian: Уладзіслаў Андрэевіч Бумага; born 5 June 1996, Minsk), known online as Vlad A4 (Russian: Влад А4) or A4, is a Belarusian YouTuber owner of the YouTube channel A4 and A5. He is considered one of the most popular Russian-speaking YouTubers.

== Early life ==
Vladislav Bumaga was born on 5 June 1996 in Minsk to the family of a primary school teacher and engineer Andrey Bumaga. He spent most of his childhood in the Sierabranka microraion.

For nine years he was fond of hockey. He played as a forward in the children's and youth sports school 'Dinamo' and 'Yunost'. For one year, he trained in the Czech Republic. After an injury, he retired from sports.

== Career ==
On 29 November 2014, Bumaga created the A4 YouTube channel, playing on his surname Bumaga (Бумага), meaning Paper. Fame came in 2016 after the release of the video '24 часа в батутном центре' (24 hours in a trampoline center), when the number of subscribers he had increased from 200 thousand to 1 million.

Bumaga began his career as a musician with a parody of the song 'Тает лёд' by Griby, which gained 35 million views. On 12 August 2018, he released the video 'Dad', and on 31 May 2019, another song was released with Katya Adushkina – 'Fire'.

In 2019, according to the YouTube Rewind video, Bumaga took ninth place among the most liked YouTubers, gaining two million likes in the video 'Покупаю всё, что ты можешь унести из магазина!' (I buy everything that you can take from the store!).

According to the analytical server Brand Analytics, in September 2019, Bumaga became the second most popular among all Russian-speaking YouTubers. According to Mikhail Bychenko, co-owner of Media Cube, an influencer like Vlad Bumaga earns from between 10,000 and 100,000 dollars a month.

On 7 February 2020, Bumaga became a guest on the Evening Urgant program.

According to the Belarusian media, Bumaga is considered to be the most popular YouTuber in the country. From 6–13 April and from 13 to 20 April, according to Social Blade, the number of views of videos on the A4 channel surpassed that of Swedish YouTuber PewDiePie.

In addition to his main channel, Bumaga created another channel 'Головной Рис' on the topic of puzzles in October 2019 and in December 2019 the channel 'A5' was created.

According to the analytical company AMDG, he is the second most popular Belarusian blogger on the social network TikTok with 4.7 million followers.

According to the SRSLY online publication, Bumaga took third place in the ranking of popular bloggers for the first half of 2020, losing to Nastya Ivleeva and Oksana Samoilova.

In 2020, Bumaga got into the Forbes rating '30 most promising Russians under 30' in the 'New Media' category, but didn't win.

In 2020, Bumaga's company 'CHETYRECHETYRE' became a resident of the Hi-Tech Park. The company is developing software for analytics of the state and dynamics of the viewer interest on video platforms such as YouTube.

In the fall of 2021, he stopped uploading videos on his account. Bumaga's producer Yekaterina Stabrovskaya stated that she could not make any statements on the topic.

In June 2025, he surpassed 5-Minute Crafts and became one of the top 20 YouTube channels by subscribers.

== Personal life ==
He is in a relationship with Belarusian video blogger and singer Julia Godunova. The couple have one daughter, born 8 May 2024.

== Controversy ==
In 2021, American YouTubers MrBeast and JustDustin accused Bumaga of plagiarism, specifically copying thumbnails and ideas for videos without getting permission from the authors of the original videos.

== Discography ==
=== EPs ===
- Детские песни (2020)

=== Albums ===
- "Батя" (2018)
- "Огонь" (featuring Katya Adushkina) (2019)
- "Каспер Бой" (2019)
- "Офишлбывший" (2019)
- "Песня про осень" (2019)
- «МАМА ЛАМА» (2024)

=== Sborniki ===
- «K mechte» (2021)
