= Modesto (disambiguation) =

Modesto, California, is a city in the United States.

Modesto may also refer to:

== Places ==
- Modesto, Illinois, United States small settlement
- Modesto Omiste Province, Bolivia
- Modesto or Modi (Meteora), a rock in Meteora, Greece

== People ==
- Modesto (surname), including a list of people with the surname Modesto
