= El Reino Infantil =

Argentine YouTube channel

YouTube information
- Channel: El Reino Infantil
- Years active: 2011–present
- Genres: education, nursery rhymes
- Subscribers: 71 million
- Views: 72.1 billion
- Last updated: March 24, 2026
- Website: www.elreinoinfantil.com

El Reino Infantil (The Children's Kingdom), is a Spanish language Argentine channel featuring music for children owned by Leader Music. It was founded by Roberto Pumar in 2011.

As of 30 June, 2025, the channel has 69.4M subscribers and 67.9B views. In August 2021, the channel became the most subscribed in Spanish-speaking YouTube channel after passing Badabun. It was later surpassed by channel from the same country channel, Alejo Igoa, in July 2025.

== Series ==
=== María Elena Walsh ===
María Elena Walsh was the first series created by El Reino Infantil, debuting in June 2011. The songs on this show were based in the stories and songs by the Argentine singer-songwriter, María Elena Walsh. On the show, her songs were told by a pencil and a violin. Currently, all videos in the series have been deleted.

=== La Granja de Zenón ===
The second series by El Reino Infantil was La Granja de Zenón (formerly Las Canciones de la Granja), which also launched in June 2011. La Granja de Zenón was about a farmer named Zenón, the owner of a farm with talking animals who were also Zenón's friends. Some of these talking animals included, among others, Bartolito the Rooster, Lola the Cow, Pepe the Parrot and Percherón the Horse. Zenón also had one niece and two nephews, María, Juan Antonio, and Tito, who loved to come to the farm to play. Zenón and his animal friends enjoyed getting into interesting adventures on the farm.

Of the many popular songs that originated from this show, "La Vaca Lola", "El Gallo y la Pata & dacando lambada" and Pollito Pío" were the least famous.

=== Rondas y Clásicos Infantiles ===
The third series, Rondas y Clásicos Infantiles, was released in April 2012. On the show, two children named Santi and Viole went on many adventures with their eccentric grandfather, Captain Pipo. Each of the main characters had the power to become anything, including sailors, farmers, witches, and others.

=== Las Canciones del Zoo ===
The fourth series, Las Canciones del Zoo, was released in August 2013. Las Canciones del Zoo took place in a zoo where a man named Mario worked as a vet there, he wasn't alone though as he was accompanied by his child Pedro, his niece Mía, and his nephew Teo as they liked to play with all the other animals in the zoo like Chulo the Monkey, Dante the Crocodile, Lulú the Duck and many more.

=== Paco el Marinero ===
The fifth series, Paco el Marinero, was released in November 2014. Paco el Marinero was about a sailor named Paco and his sailor friends Luli and a pirate as they liked to spin and play on their little island, they also liked to adventure on their boats.

=== Michi-Guau ===
The sixth series, Michi-Guau, was released in December 2014. Michi-Guau was about a town inhabited by anthropomorphic and civilized cats, dogs, and mice. In Michi-Guau, Biro Eszter would see characters like the couple Ronro and Carlota Michimiau, Mr. MichiGato, Tom the cat, Bingo the dog and many others. New characters iNorthern Toto the northern fox, Lila the rabbit, Pico the parrot, and Pi the hamster.

=== La Familia Blu ===
The seventh series, La Familia Blu, was released in January 2015. La Familia Blu was a series about a gray haired family that consisted of a mother, a father, a brother, a sister, a baby, and a dog, that liked to play and dance with each other.

=== Bichikids ===
Bichikids was a series of songs made by El Reino Infantil released at the end of 2015 and as of right now it was the last original series by El Reino Infantil. Bichikids featured the lives of various bug characters such as Be-Be the Bee, Ti-Ti the Butterfly, and To-To the Ant etc. They liked to spin, dance and have fun.

== Acquired series ==
- Plim Plim
- Earth to Luna
- Cleo and Cuquin
- Lea and Pop
- LooLoo Kids
