= Felipe Neto =

Brazilian YouTuber (born 1988)

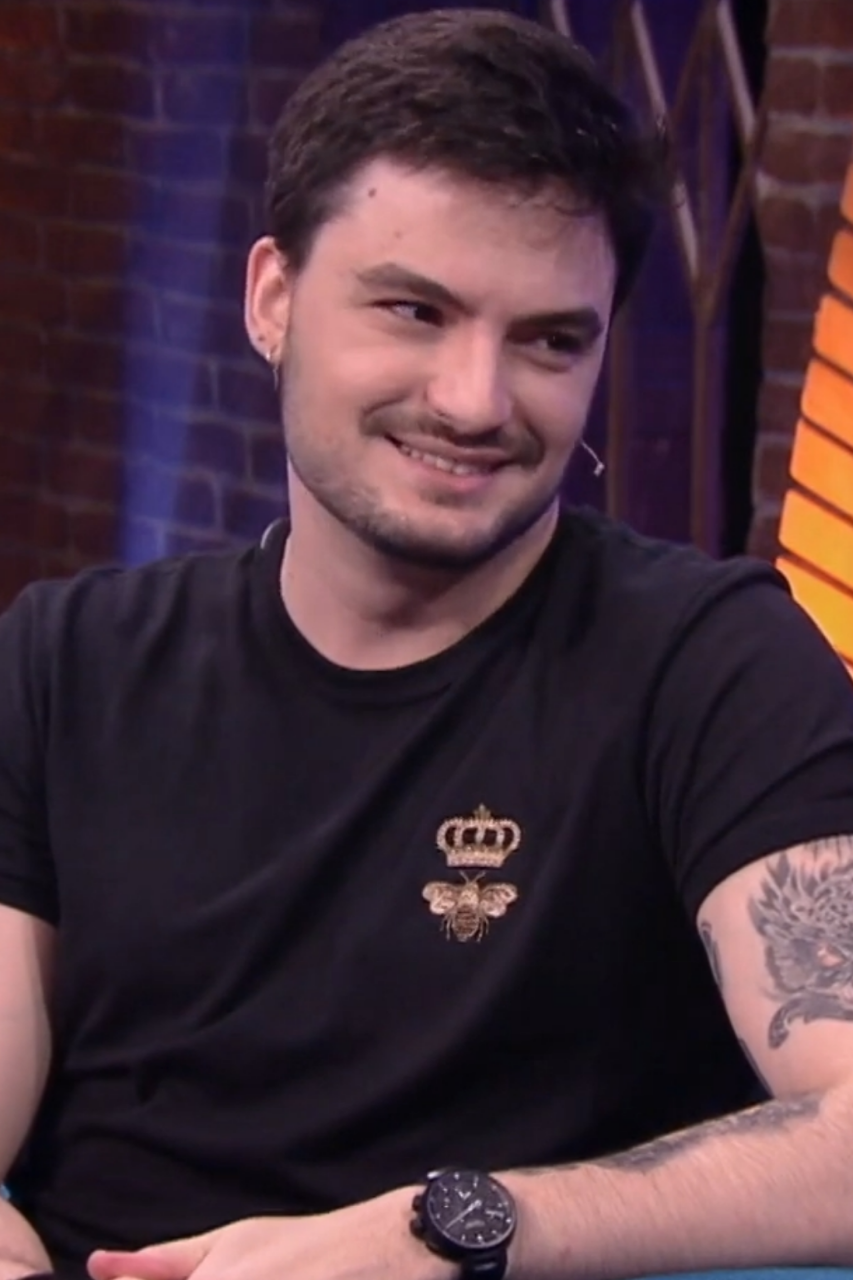
- Neto in 2022
- Born: Felipe Neto Rodrigues Vieira; January 21, 1988 (age 38); Rio de Janeiro, Brazil
- Occupations: YouTuber; comedian; philanthropist; cinematic and image producer
- Relatives: Luccas Neto (brother)

YouTube information
- Channel: Felipe Neto
- Genres: Humor; vlog
- Subscribers: 48 million
- Views: 19.70 billion
- Last updated: July 28, 2026

Felipe Neto Rodrigues Vieira (Brazilian Portuguese: [feˈlipi ˈnɛtu roˈdɾiɡiz viˈe(j)ɾɐ, fiˈ-]; born January 21, 1988) is a Brazilian YouTuber, businessman, actor, comedian, writer and philanthropist, currently having 44.7 million subscribers and more than 15 billion accumulated views. He is also the brother of YouTuber Luccas Neto. Currently, his videos focus on general entertainment.

Felipe is the founder of Paramaker, a business of network inside of YouTube, which owns channels such as Parafernalha and IGN Brasil Network, managing approximately 5,000 channels, as an effort to professionalize the online video market in Brazil. He sold the company in 2015 to focus on his YouTube channel.

In 2020, he was included on Time's list of the 100 most influential people in the world.

== Early life ==
Felipe Neto was born on January 21, 1988, in Rio de Janeiro to a Brazilian father and a Portuguese mother. He has dual Brazilian and Portuguese citizenship. Felipe is the most-known fan of the Brazilian sports club Botafogo FR, a club which he has sponsored, and also the Portuguese club FC Porto. He currently lives in Barra da Tijuca, a neighborhood in Rio de Janeiro.

== Filmography ==
=== Web ===
Year	Title	Role	Notes
2010–present	Felipe Neto	Himself	Official Channel on YouTube
2010	Fala a Verdade	Himself	3 videos; Prototype of Não Faz Sentido
2010–2014		Himself	First memorable video
2011–2014	Parafernalha	Various/Cameo roles	Internet Video Producer
2012–2015	TGS Brasil	Himself/Cameo roles	Official Channel on YouTube about games
2013	A Toca	Himself	webseries exclusive for Netflix Brazil
2015	YouTube FanFest Brasil	Himself	Exclusive event for YouTube
2015–2016	Bastidores: MVNFS	Himself	Backstage of the theater play "Minha Vida Não Faz Sentido"
2016	#LasVegasREAL	Himself	Websérie-reality of Grupo It Brazil
2016	Não Faz Sentido!	Himself	The return
2016	Parafernalha	Various/Cameo Roles	Internet video producer
2016	Animaneto	Himself (voice)	Animation videos
2016	A Origem	Himself	Talk program
2016	Multishow Brazilian Music Awards 2016	Himself	Host
2017	#MIAMIREAL	Himself	Websérie-reality of Grupo It Brazil
2017	Minha Vida Não Faz Sentido	Himself	Theater play released on Netflix
2017–2019	Irmãos Neto	Himself	YouTube channel together his brother, Luccas Neto
2018–2019	The Final Level	Himself	Channel focused in Games with other YouTube Creators

=== Film ===
Year	Title	Role	Notes
2012	Totalmente Inocentes	Himself	Videocast Host
2018	Tudo Por Um Pop Star	Billy Bold	

=== Advertisements ===
Year	Company/Brand	Notes
2010	Wise Up Teens	English School
2011	Wise Up	"English School" with Rodrigo Santoro, Fábio Porchat and Fiuk

== Theater ==
Year	Title	Role	Notes
2011	Avacalhados	–	Cameo
2015–2016	Minha Vida Não Faz Sentido	Himself	My Life Makes No Sense on Netflix
2017–2018	Felipe Neto Mega Fest	Himself	

== Publications ==
Year	Book	Notes
2013	Não Faz Sentido!	History of the program: Não Faz Sentido!
2017	A Trajetória de um dos Maiores YouTubers do Brasil	Career trajectory and photos
2018	A Vida Por Trás das Câmeras	Biography, personal memory and photos
2019	O Mundo Segundo Felipe Neto: verdades hilárias sobre a vida	Life, according to Felipe Neto
2024	Como enfrentar o ódio	In the book, Felipe Neto portrays his process of political awareness in the country.

== Awards and nominations ==
Year	Award	Category	Result	Ref.
2010	MTV Video Music Brazil	Web Star	Won	
2010	4º Prêmio Tudo de Bom!	Personality of the year	Nominated	
2011	YouPIX	Vem, Gente!	Won	
2011	YouPIX	Vlogger of the year!	Won	
2011	Prêmio Jovem Brasileiro	Greatest discovery of the year on Internet	Won	
2012	YouPIX	Entertainer of the year!	Won	
2017	Nickelodeon Kids' Choice Awards (Brazil)	Favorite Men YouTuber	Won	

== Controversies ==
As a popular YouTuber in Brazil, Felipe occasionally streams his online games to his audience. He was caught cheating in online chess games in 2021. He admitted to being assisted by a chess engine while playing and argued that he was instructed by a chess coach to do so as it would be an adequate training method to improve his knowledge of chess.
