= Igoa =

Igoa is a surname. Notable people with the surname include:

- Alejo Igoa (born 1996), Argentine YouTuber
- Silvestre Igoa (1920–1969), Spanish footballer
