= Bright Side (YouTube channel) =

YouTube channel owned by TheSoul Group

- Years active: 2017–present

YouTube information
- Channel: BRIGHT SIDE
- Genres: Education; How-to
- Subscribers: 44.5 million
- Views: 11.9 billion
- Last updated: October 10, 2026
- Website: brightside.me

Bright Side (stylized in all caps) is a Cypriot YouTube channel operated by media publisher TheSoul Group. Founded in 2017, the channel uploads videos regarding how-to trivia as well as history and knowledge and mistakes. The YouTube channel has over 44.5 million subscribers to its main channel, and over 11.584 billion views. The channel has over ten thousand videos.

== History ==
Bright Side was created on 15 March 2017, and posts videos that are a mix of "facts," riddles, and life hacks. Bright Side has been described as a "popular content farm channel".

In June 2019, Bright Side popularized a 382-day fast held in 1965 by Angus Barbieri, after creating an animated video recounting the event. The video received over 300,000 views within a week of its upload.

The channel is operated by TheSoul Group, a company founded by Russian developers Pavel Radaev and Marat Mukhametov. The company owns 100+ channels including 5-Minute Crafts, 5-Minute Crafts Kids, 5-Minute Crafts Girly, 7-Second Riddles and 5-Minute Magic. In 2019, the company operated 40 Facebook pages in 10 languages and had 550 employees. In 2021 the company had 100 channel brands in 19 different languages, with a 2,100 member global workforce.

== See also ==
- List of most-subscribed YouTube channels
- YouTube
