= TheSoul Group =

Global media company based in Cyprus

- Predecessor: AdMe
- Founded: 2016; 10 years ago
- Founder: Pavel Radaev; Marat Mukhametov
- Headquarters: Limassol, Cyprus
- Key people: Arthur Mamedov (CEO); Anastasiia Vinogradova (CCO)
- Products: Digital media
- Website: thesoul.group

TheSoul Group (formerly known as TheSoul Publishing) is a global digital media publisher based in Limassol, Cyprus which oversees multiple brands that monetize based on short-form content. Founded in 2016, it focuses on video content, most of which has been categorised as content farm material. TheSoul's brands include YouTube channels such as 5-Minute Crafts, Bright Side, La La Life, Teen-Z, and 123 GO!

Although TheSoul is headquartered in Cyprus, its videos are produced all over the world with multiple offices throughout Europe and North America. It develops videos across 100 channel brands in 19 different languages.

The company has drawn criticism for the content on their channels, for being unusual and bizarre and its reliance on clickbait.

== History ==
=== 2016–2017: 5-Minute Crafts and Bright Side ===
TheSoul Publishing was launched by web developers Pavel Radaev and Marat Mukhametov, who are Cyprus-based Russian nationals, in the Cypriot city of Limassol in 2016. It grew out of the duo's Kazan-based company AdMe, which focused on digital advertising and content distribution. Later that year, TheSoul launched its YouTube channel 5-Minute Crafts, which became 13th most-subscribed YouTube channel in the world as of April 2023. In 2017, the company launched Bright Side, which became its second-most popular YouTube channel.

In 2019, TheSoul said it had 550 employees and produced 1,500 videos a month. In 2021, it was recorded that the company had 2,100 employees, 80% of whom work remotely and follow a "no meetings" policy. As of October 2022, the company's employees are based in over 70 countries and six continents.

In March 2021, TheSoul was named Digital Studio of the Year by Digiday at its Video & TV Awards. In September, the company published a video launching its virtual YouTuber musician character Polar, which received over 3 million views by December. TheSoul also announced a distribution deal with French record label Believe in December. In 2021, the company adapted content from its various DIY-focused channels (including 5-Minute Crafts) for distribution on Pinterest. This began with translating 5-Minute Crafts' videos into Portuguese and Spanish, a move that was recognized with the Best Use of Pinterest Award at that year's Drum Awards for Digital Industries.

=== 2022: Partnerships ===
In May 2022, TheSoul announced a partnership with Retail Monster to develop licensing and retail programs around 5-Minute Crafts. In November, TheSoul launched a partnership with Samsung TV Plus which brought 5-Minute Crafts and TeenVee to TV audiences in Belgium, Italy, Luxembourg, the Netherlands, Spain, and Sweden. In the same month, TheSoul Publishing partnered with Kidoodle.TV to bring 5-Minute Crafts, Baby Zoo, and Slick Slime Sam to Kidoodle in both English and Spanish. In December, TheSoul Publishing acquired a majority stake in the management firm Underscore Talent. That same month, the company opened its Latvian branch in Riga.

== Leadership ==
In October, the company named its new CEO as Arthur Mamedov, who had been COO since 2016. This came after founders Radaev and Mukhametov, said they would "step away from day-to-day operations to assume non-executive advisory positions". Anastasiia Vinogradova was also promoted to CCO.

== Popularity ==
TheSoul is the largest media production hub in the world and is the largest company on YouTube and Facebook in terms of social media views. The company has over 1.5 billion subscribers worldwide. Most of its channels feature "life hacks" and have been categorised as content farms. The company also has a presence on Instagram, Snapchat, and TikTok. In November 2021, Variety wrote that TheSoul had the ninth most viewed YouTube Short on its 5-Minute Crafts channel, as well as the most viewed YouTube Short overall with over 433 million views. By April 2023, 5-Minute Crafts had amassed over 25.7 billion views and Bright Side had amassed over 10.6 billion views.

== Reception ==
In November 2018, Vox published an article calling TheSoul's content "cringy", "clickbait", and "bizarre". However, the article also stated, "To answer the implicit question, unlike many viral Facebook posts that came out of Russia over the past few years, TheSoul Publishing's content does not appear to be overtly political."

In December 2019, the company's channel Smart Banana was criticized by Lawfare for making "history videos with a political tinge". One video falsely claimed that Ukraine is part of Russia, another gave a "heavily sanitized" summary of Joseph Stalin's reign and incorrectly claimed that Alaska was a gift from Russia to the United States, and a third video predicted that the United States would likely collapse within 20 years. The Lawfare article's claims were picked up by American political commentator Rachel Maddow, who likened the videos to Russia's interference in the 2016 United States elections. However, Vice found no new political content on any of TheSoul's channels in the lead-up to the 2020 United States elections, and described it as more of a content farm than a channel intended to sway public opinion. Shortly after the Lawfare article was published, TheSoul apologised for posting "historically questionable" videos and removed the content, as well as announcing an editorial decision to no longer create history videos and stating that it had never worked with "any government or semi-government organization of any country".

In June 2020, TheSoul's animated subsidiary channel Actually Happened was deleted, and references to the channel were removed from the company's website. The channel, which had over 4 million subscribers, hosted cartoons of supposedly real events presented as firsthand experiences of American teenagers; the stories were often questioned.
