= Thiago Modesto =

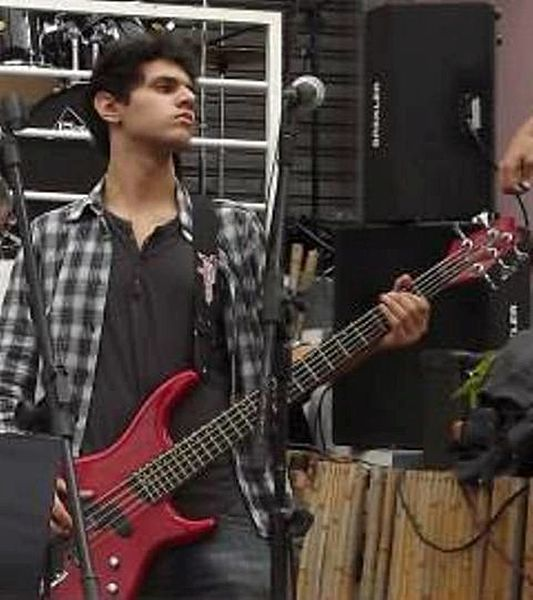
- Thiago Modesto performing with Dynastia in 2013

Background information
- Born: Thiago Viana Modesto; August 31, 1996 (age 30); São Paulo, Brazil
- Genre: Alternative Metal
- Occupations: Singer, songwriter, musician
- Instruments: Vocals; Bass; Keyboards
- Years active: 2012–present

Thiago Viana Modesto (born August 31, 1996) is a Brazilian singer, songwriter, blogger and musician. He is best known as the lead singer and bass player of the Brazilian alternative metal band Quimere, which he co-founded in 2015.

== Biography ==
Modesto is the son of the preacher and Brazilian politician Claudio Modesto, and was born and raised in São Paulo. At the age of 12 he began writing the blog Maníacos por Futebol ("Football Maniacs"), which became known to the general public in 2010 when he was invited to cover the event Yahoo Penalty that counted on personalities like goalkeeper Zetti. Modesto also wrote for the Rawr blog. At age 15, in 2011, he was nominated for the "Muso do Ano" (beauty of the year) award by YouPIX. The same year he ended the activities on his blogs.

Modesto began his musical trajectory at age 14, playing in several garage bands. Joined the Dynastia band in 2013 where he played with his current bandmate Vitor Assan. With the end of the band both founded Quimere, band that remains until today.
