= How to Cook That =

Australian website and YouTube channel

How To Cook That

- Screenshot How To Cook That homepage screenshot
- Website type: Website & YouTube channel
- Headquarters: Melbourne, Australia
- Owner: Ann Reardon
- Creator: Ann Reardon
- Editor: Ann Reardon
- Website: www.howtocookthat.net
- Registration: Youtube in 16 April 2011
- Users: 4.9 million as of 24 July 2022
- Launched: 16 April 2011
- Current status: Active

How To Cook That (often stylised as H2CT) is an Australian website and YouTube baking channel that provides video recipes on baking and decorating themed cakes, desserts, chocolate creations and other confectionery. Launched as a website in 2011 by founder Ann Reardon, it later gained more than 4 million followers on YouTube, surpassing more than 15.3 million video views per month. The channel has been featured in major publications, including Forbes, The Huffington Post, and The Sydney Morning Herald.

== History ==
How To Cook That was founded by Ann Reardon in 2009. Prior to becoming a YouTube personality, she worked as a qualified food scientist and dietitian. She left the field of food to work with youth as a youth pastor in a low socioeconomic area in Western Australia. She self-catered for various events. During that time, Reardon taught many of the young people how to cook in her own kitchen.

Reardon started How To Cook That on YouTube in 2011. She launched the website after she had her third son as something to keep her mind active during night feeds. Reardon wrote a single recipe post each week and made occasional videos to complement the recipes. The videos were too large for the site so she uploaded them to YouTube and embedded them into the website. As the popularity of the videos grew, Reardon started uploading them more frequently.

Views started in the thousands and grew to millions, attracting media attention. In 2013, Reardon was contacted by the BBC to produce a cake for the 50th anniversary of Doctor Who. She made a chocolate Dalek cake that was later featured on the BBC as well as Variety. The same year, Reardon signed an agreement with DECA, a YouTube multi-channel network based in the United States. She also began a brand partnership in December 2013, using appliances by Breville who supplied her with products for giveaways.

Subscriber numbers grew rapidly with the increased media attention and by February 2014 the channel had 450,000 subscribers and averaged 3.7 million video views per month, making it Australia's most popular YouTube baking channel and the third most popular worldwide. By August of that same year, it had over 770,000 subscribers and received more than 5.3 million video views for the month. At the end of 2014, the channel surpassed 1,000,000 subscribers, with over 100 million views in total, and was featured in Tubefilter News. By February 2015, the channel was attracting 14 million views in a single month.

== Content ==
Recipes on How To Cook That feature mainly desserts, including cakes decorated as cartoon characters, social media logos, and giant classic candy bars. Some of the most popular include a 5 lb Snickers bar, an Instagram cake, and a giant Kit Kat chocolate. The Instagram cake was featured in The Huffington Post as well as over 500 websites. The recipe for an Avengers cake was featured in an article on CNET, and Reardon also developed a recipe for a YouTube cake. The website sells its own products, including cake templates.

In addition to the website and YouTube channel, Reardon released a mobile app called Surprise Cakes in the Apple Store and on Google Play. It is considered the world's first augmented reality app for cakes and was inspired by a gaming app. The app allows users to make a cake come to life with 3D moving dragons, unicorns, rainbows and fireworks.

Other notable reoccurring segments include:

=== Debunking videos ===
Reardon aims to recreate techniques, recipes, and "food hacks" (recipes that claim to present an easy way to make an existing dish or a new one) from popular videos to show that they are often faked or otherwise misleading, and to warn viewers of dangerous trends. Reardon often debunks and calls out large content farms such as Five Minute Crafts, First Media, So Yummy, Troom Troom, BuzzFeed and YumUp, as well as many other channels producing recipe and life hack content that is often fake (ice cream frosting), dangerous (wrapping someone's head in plastic wrap to avoid onion fumes), irresponsible (washing clothes with eco soap in a natural stream), useless (using a toilet lid as a portable table), and unnecessarily complicated (cutting a cake with toothpicks and dental floss). Reardon often says that these videos are "the fake news of the baking world."

=== Clever or Never ===
Reardon, usually accompanied by her husband Dave, tests various food gadgets to see how useful they are. In more recent episodes, Reardon has also tested non-food gadgets.

=== 200 year old recipes ===
Reardon makes recipes from her collection of old cookbooks, most of which are between 100–200 years old. She also makes more historically significant recipes, including the first recipe in English, and multiple recipes written by Marie-Antoine Carême. Earlier episodes also saw Reardon don a faux British RP accent.

=== Cake Rescue ===
Reardon tries to rescue viral cake fails, usually showing quick fixes or correcting common mistakes.

=== Exposing the food industry ===
Reardon gives an insight into a particular part or problem within the food industry. Topics have included chocolate, artificial food dyes, milk, and health food.

=== When Food Companies Get Sued ===
Reardon gives an overview of various lawsuits involving major food companies, including McDonald’s, Thermomix, and false advertising.

=== Gingerbread House ===
A yearly Christmas series where Reardon makes a gingerbread house.

=== Teeny Weeny Baking ===
Where Reardon makes recipes in a dollhouse fitted with a fully functioning kitchen. Her miniature baking includes making tiny eggs using sodium alginate.

== See also ==
- List of YouTube personalities
