= Ireneusz Krosny =

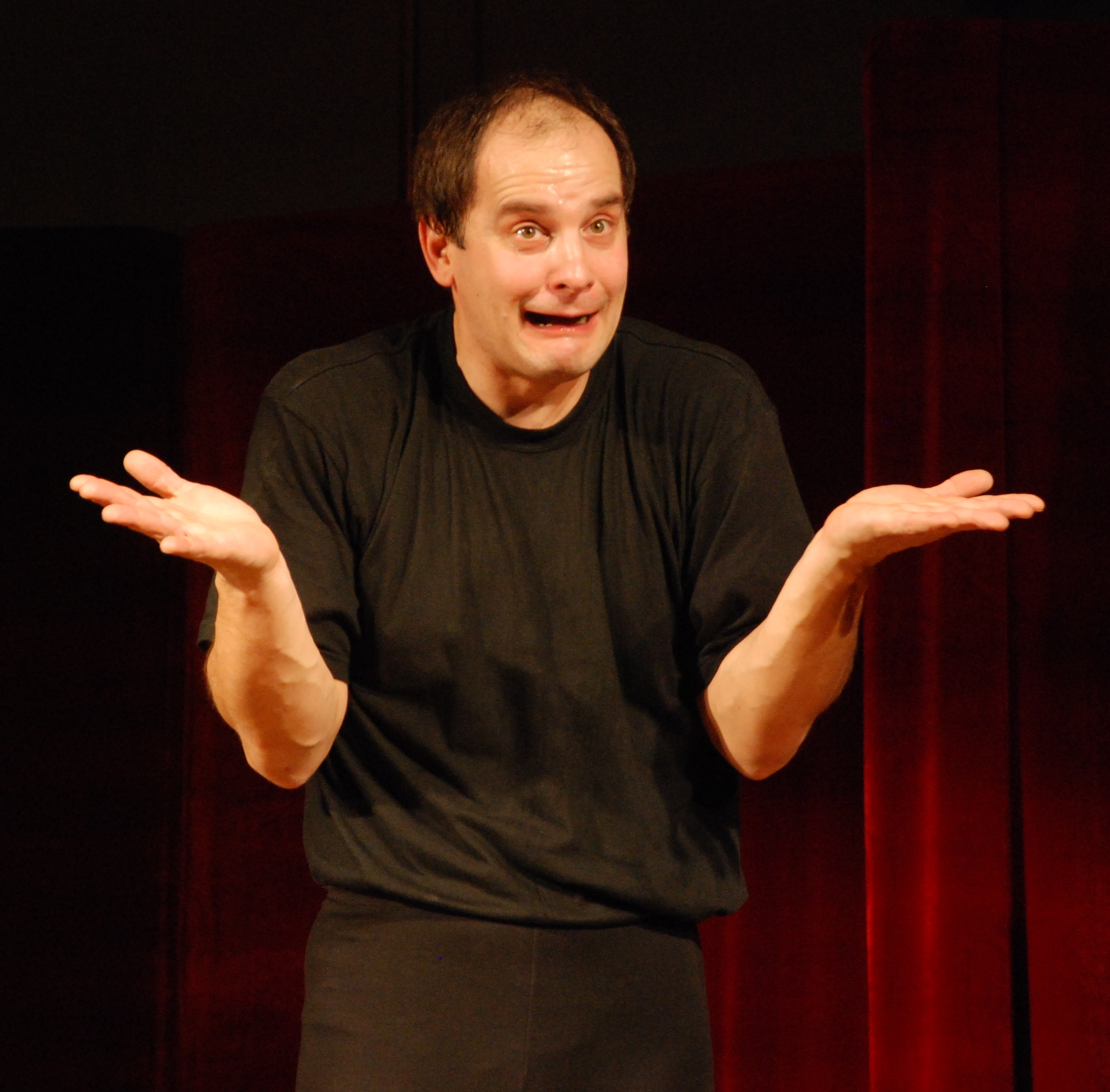
- Krosny in 2007
- Born: 1968 (age 57–58); Tychy, Poland
- Occupations: Actor, mime artist
- Years active: 1992-present
- Website: http://www.krosny.net

Ireneusz Krosny (born 1968) is a Polish actor and mime artist.

== Early life and career ==
Born in Tychy, between 1982 and 1992 he worked with three amateur pantomime groups, most notably, "Scena Pantomimy", founded and led by Krosny. He began his professional career in 1992 with the solo act "One Mime Theatre". He received several top awards at comedy festivals in Poland, and also had his own television shows there. He began his international career in 1997, performing throughout Europe as well as in North America and Asia. He was guest at the Chunchon International Mime Festival in South Korea and many other festivals, such as the "Lachmesse" in Germany, "Kaukliar" festival in Slovakia, "Bodylanguage Festival" in Sweden, the Edinburgh Fringe, and the "Festival du Rire" in Montreux, where he also won the Golden Rose of Montreux for the best international act. In the USA he received the Critic's Choice Award from The Chicago Reader:

Polish mime Ireneusz Krosny draws more on the conventions of clowning than of abstract Marcel-Marceau-style white face mime, and his premises are rather generic—a conductor rehearses his orchestra, a dog owner adapts to his pet, a woman removes her finery at evening's end. What renders these vignettes fresh and funny are Krosny's Red Skelton-like facial expressions and an elegant inventiveness that allows him to embellish yet keep the action free of extraneous material. [...] A scene depicting a guest's reactions to a child's cello recital pulled the biggest laugh at the performance I attended, but action-movie fans like me will find the piece entitled "Arnold arms himself" irresistible.

== Awards ==
- 1995: Grand Prix XVI Humor and Satire Meeting Lidzbark / Poland
- 1996: Grand Prix XII PAKA Cabaret Festival Kraków / Poland
- 1996: Grand Prix II Mazury Cabaret Summer "Mulatka" Ełk / Poland
- 1998: Cabaret Revelation of the Year Festival "Kataryniarze" Gdańsk / Poland
- 1998: The Critic's Choice (The Chicago Reader) Chicago / U.S.A.
- 2000: "Andrzej" Andrzej Waligórski Award of the "Elita" cabaret / Poland
- 2008: Total Theatre Award Nomination / FRINGE Festival Edinburgh / UK
- 2008: Golden Rose of Montreux for the best international act / Montreux / Switzerland

== See also ==
- Judson Laipply, creator of viral "Evolution of Dance" clip, which inspired Krosny to create a similar performance
