= Modesto (surname) =

Origin
- Meaning: modest, humble, simple, virtuous
- Region of origin: Latin Europe, Latin America

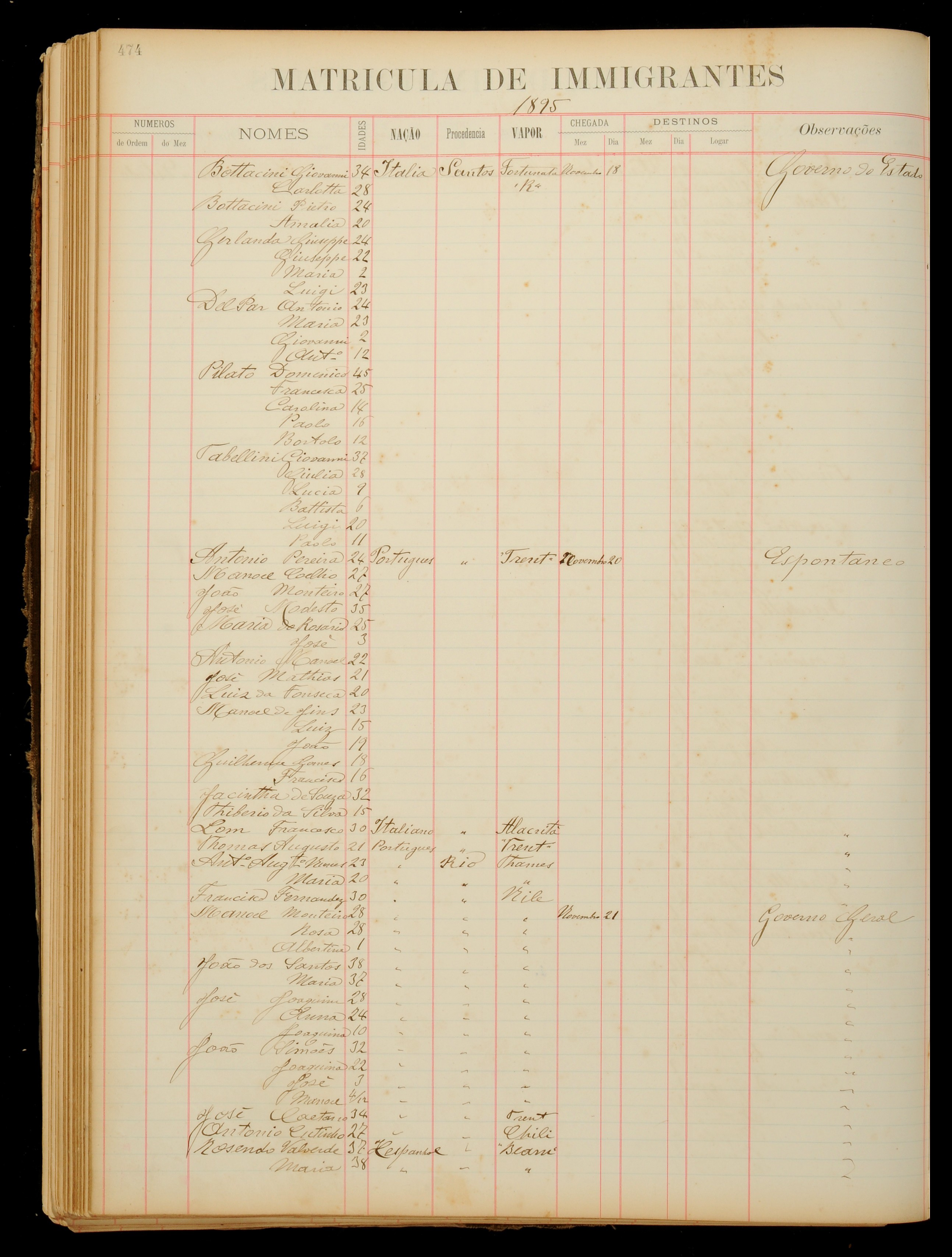
Registration of an Italian immigrant named Giuseppe Modesto at the Port of Santos, 1888

Modesto is a surname originating in Latin Europe and Latin America, specially Brazil. Its meaning can be: modest, humble, simple, virtuous, among other synonyms.

Its presence is very common in Brazil, Italy, Portugal, and Spain. The strong wave of Italian immigration caused the surname to spread throughout the Americas, especially in Brazil, after the abolition of slavery in 1888.

== Afro-Brazilian lineage in Minas Gerais ==
In addition to its European roots, the surname Modesto also emerged independently in 19th-century Brazil as part of an Afro-Brazilian patronymic tradition. One documented lineage originated in the municipalities of Guarará and Rio Pomba, in the state of Minas Gerais, where a former enslaved man named Modesto Barbosa da Cruz is believed to have been the patriarch of a family that adopted his first name as a surname after emancipation.

This naming strategy, common among freed persons in 19th-century Brazil, allowed for new family identities to be forged following slavery. Barbosa da Cruz’s children, including João Modesto da Cruz (1858–1902), began using “Modesto” as a surname, creating a distinctive Afro-Brazilian branch of the name.

This family also maintained a multi-generational tradition of work with the Leopoldina Railway, illustrating how formerly enslaved families integrated into wage labor economies in the early Brazilian Republic.

Estimates based on fertility rates and generational expansion suggest that the number of descendants could range in the tens of thousands today, with the Modesto surname remaining present in civil and church records throughout southeastern Brazil.

This example demonstrates how surnames in Latin America can emerge from both colonial legacies and post-slavery reinvention, highlighting the complex sociocultural history behind naming practices.

== People ==
- Aílton de Oliveira Modesto (born 1980), Brazilian footballer (soccer)
- Antonio Modesto Quirasco (1904-1981), Mexican politician
- Arturo Modesto Tolentino (1910-2004), 12th President of the Senate of the Philippines
- Carlos Modesto Piedra (1895–1988), Provisional President of Cuba
- Claudio Modesto (born 1966), Brazilian pastor, politician, teacher and activist
- Delfim Modesto Brandão (1835-?), Civil and Governative Judge of the Couto Misto
- Enrico Modesto Bevignani (1841-1903), Italian conductor, harpsichordist, composer, and impresario
- Everton José Modesto Silva (born 1988), Brazilian footballer (soccer)
- Francesco Modesto (born 1982), Italian footballer (soccer)
- François Modesto (born 1978), French footballer (soccer)
- Jose Modesto Darcourt (1958-2014), Cuban baseball player
- Joseph Wol Modesto, South Sudanese politician
- Josué Modesto dos Passos Subrinho (born 1956), Brazilian economist, and a professor of economics at the Federal University of Sergipe
- Juan Modesto (1906–1969), Spanish soldier
- Nino Modesto (born 1980), Spanish footballer (soccer)
- Paulo Modesto da Silva Júnior (born 1993), Brazilian footballer (soccer)
- Pedro Modesto Garcia (born 1950), Puerto Rican baseball player
- Rodrigo Modesto (born 1987), Brazilian footballer (soccer)
- Salvador Trane Modesto (1930-2015), Roman Catholic bishop
- Thiago Modesto (born 1996), Brazilian singer, songwriter, blogger and musician
