= Peter Oakley =

British vlogger (1927–2014)

- Oakley in 2011
- Born: 20 August 1927; Belper, Derbyshire, England
- Died: 23 March 2014 (aged 86); Bakewell, Derbyshire, England
- Years active: 2006–2014
- Spouse: Patricia Oakley

YouTube information
- Channel: geriatric1927
- Genres: Vlogging; autobiography
- Subscribers: 112 thousand
- Views: 11.5 million
- Last updated: 1 September 2026

Peter Oakley (20 August 1927 – 23 March 2014) was an English pensioner and Internet personality, who posted YouTube videos under the Internet pseudonym geriatric1927. With his YouTube debut in August 2006 with Telling it all, a series of five-to-ten-minute autobiographical videos, Oakley gained popularity with a wide section of the YouTube community. Amongst the autobiographical details revealed in his videos are that he served as a radar mechanic during World War II, that he had a lifelong love of motorcycles, and that he lived alone as a widower and pensioner.

His unforeseen rise was widely reported by international media outlets and online news sources and blogs. After resisting all media attention for a long time (including requests for interviews, photographs, and attempts to identify him), insisting that he only wished to converse with the YouTube community in an informal and personal way, Oakley finally gave his first interview, for the BBC's The Money Programme, which was aired on BBC Two on 16 February 2007.

By mid-2006, Oakley was the most-subscribed channel on YouTube, only to be passed by Lonelygirl15 28 days after achieving that status and was the first channel to achieve 20,000 subscribers. His rise to the #1 position took place in just over a week. In the process, he displaced users who had been around since the site's launch, including NBC-signed Brooke Brodack. In November of that year, he had 30,000 subscribers. Oakley also holds the record for being the first user on YouTube to reach the milestone of 25,000 subscribers. He uploaded 434 videos between 2006 and 2014 covering several topics from childhood memories to setting up a Google account. He also set up a second channel dedicated to music, Geriatric1927Blues, in 2009. His main channel reached the 100,000 subscriber milestone in January 2023.

Oakley was later diagnosed with cancer which was too far advanced for treatment. He posted his final video on 12 February 2014 and died a month later on the morning of 23 March 2014, aged 86.

== YouTube career ==
After Oakley's introductory video, which has been viewed over three million times, he began producing his autobiographical series, Telling It All. These made him an Internet celebrity almost overnight, gaining mention in various media, such as BBC News and GMTV, as well as prompting the creation of websites bearing his username. In Telling it all 7, Oakley repudiated those sites, saying he was not affiliated with them and had no control over their content.

In the series, Oakley describes some of the major events and periods of his life, including

- Growing up during World War II, and living as a young teen in Norwich, which was bombed by the Luftwaffe.
- His experience in the primary and secondary education system of England in the 1930s, and his fortunate selection to have his education "extended" past the age of 14, a privilege during the period reserved for children deemed to be intelligent.
- His conscription into the British Army, and his selection as a radar technician.
- His return to civilian life and the job he had left behind.
- A period of tertiary education in Leicester, England, where he met his future wife and developed his passion for motorcycling.
- His employment in Leicester as a public health inspector.

On 17 August 2006, Oakley uploaded "Telling it all 7", in which he made a statement about how much attention he had received from the media over the previous days. He mentioned that this was not what he sought or wanted. He also stated that any websites using his username (geriatric1927) were in no way affiliated with him. In "Telling it all 7", he stated that he had received many messages from advertising companies, telephone companies, and newspaper companies that wanted to interview him, but he preferred to speak only to his fellow YouTubers, whom he considered his friends.

On 16 February 2007, Oakley made his first television appearance, on a special episode of the BBC's The Money Programme called "Coming to Your Screen: DIY TV". The program was taped in the autumn of 2006. He was also featured in a radio interview for the BBC World Service. In March 2007, Oakley announced that he was working on some television programmes about silver surfing.

Oakley was part of a BBC documentary in which he was recruited as one of The Zimmers, a group of pensioners whom the documentary maker Tim Samuels brought together to sing The Who's classic "My Generation" to highlight the plight of pensioners in modern Britain. The single was released in May 2007 to raise money for the charity Age Concern. As part of The Zimmers, Oakley recorded a version of the Alan Parsons Project's song "Old and Wise". His work with the band took him to Washington, D.C. in September 2007, as a guest of the AARP.

In early 2010, entertainer Al Chantrey—a friend of Oakley's and a fellow YouTube user—wrote and recorded a song for him which Oakley featured in several videos. The song, entitled "Telling It All" (based on Oakley's video series), talks about Oakley's life. On 5 March 2014, Chantrey posted the song on his channel on YouTube, accompanied by video footage of Oakley as a tribute following the announcement of his illness.

Oakley was featured in an installment of Yahoo! Current Buzz (which chronicles the top searches on the Internet), entitled "Retired and Wired".

== Legacy and impact ==
Peter Oakley has been referred to as the "Internet's Grandad". Oakley's YouTube success inspired other older people, particularly men with life experiences to share, to begin posting vlogs on them. Oakley influenced World War II veteran Martin H. Slobodkin (1920–2006), who, under the name MHarris1920, started to post his blogs. Martin died in October 2006 and received an outpouring of tributes from other YouTube users after his wife, Teresa, posted a video announcing his death. His widow temporarily took over his blogs but later closed this account. Another older person was Bernhard von Schwerin (1927–2022), who appeared under the name bernie1927. He too was a World War II veteran, but serving on the German side. He was encouraged by Oakley and talked about his youth and his many travels as well as his emigration to the U.S. in 1951.

Artist Annemarie Wright was so inspired by Oakley's story that she dedicated a piece of artwork to him. The image is of Oakley to the lyrics of The Zimmers' version of "My Generation".

== Notes and references ==
Honorary titles
Preceded by Brookers	Most Subscribed Channel on YouTube	Succeeded by lonelygirl15
