= Claudio Modesto =

Brazilian pastor, politician, teacher and activist

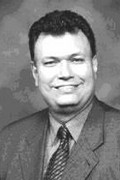
- Born: Cláudio Rogério da Silveira Modesto; May 23, 1963 (age 62); Rio de Janeiro, Brazil
- Education: Foreign Trade, ESAN; Business administration, ESAN
- Occupation(s): Pastor, teacher, businessman and politician
- Spouse: Claudia Modesto
- Children: Thiago Modesto
- Religion: Protestantism
- Offices held: General superintendent, Christian community of Alto da Lapa

Cláudio Modesto (born May 23, 1963) is a Brazilian pastor, politician, teacher and activist. He is best known for his activism for vitiligo and social projects.

== Early life and ministry ==
Modesto was born in the neighborhood of Brás de Pina, Rio de Janeiro, from a humble family with a Umbandist tradition. Being only the fifth generation of his family with the surname Modesto, directly descending from Modesto Barbosa da Cruz. At the age of 16 he converted to Protestantism and with 18 traveled for a month in a missionary project in Bolivia. He moved to the city of São Paulo in the 1980s on account of his employment.

In São Paulo he became involved with the Igreja Renascer em Cristo, where he became an important bishop. In the late 1990s he left Renascer for disagreements and founded his own ministry. In 2001 he traveled to Singapore where he attended a leadership course at the Haggai Institute and became involved with ministries from other countries, mainly South Africa.

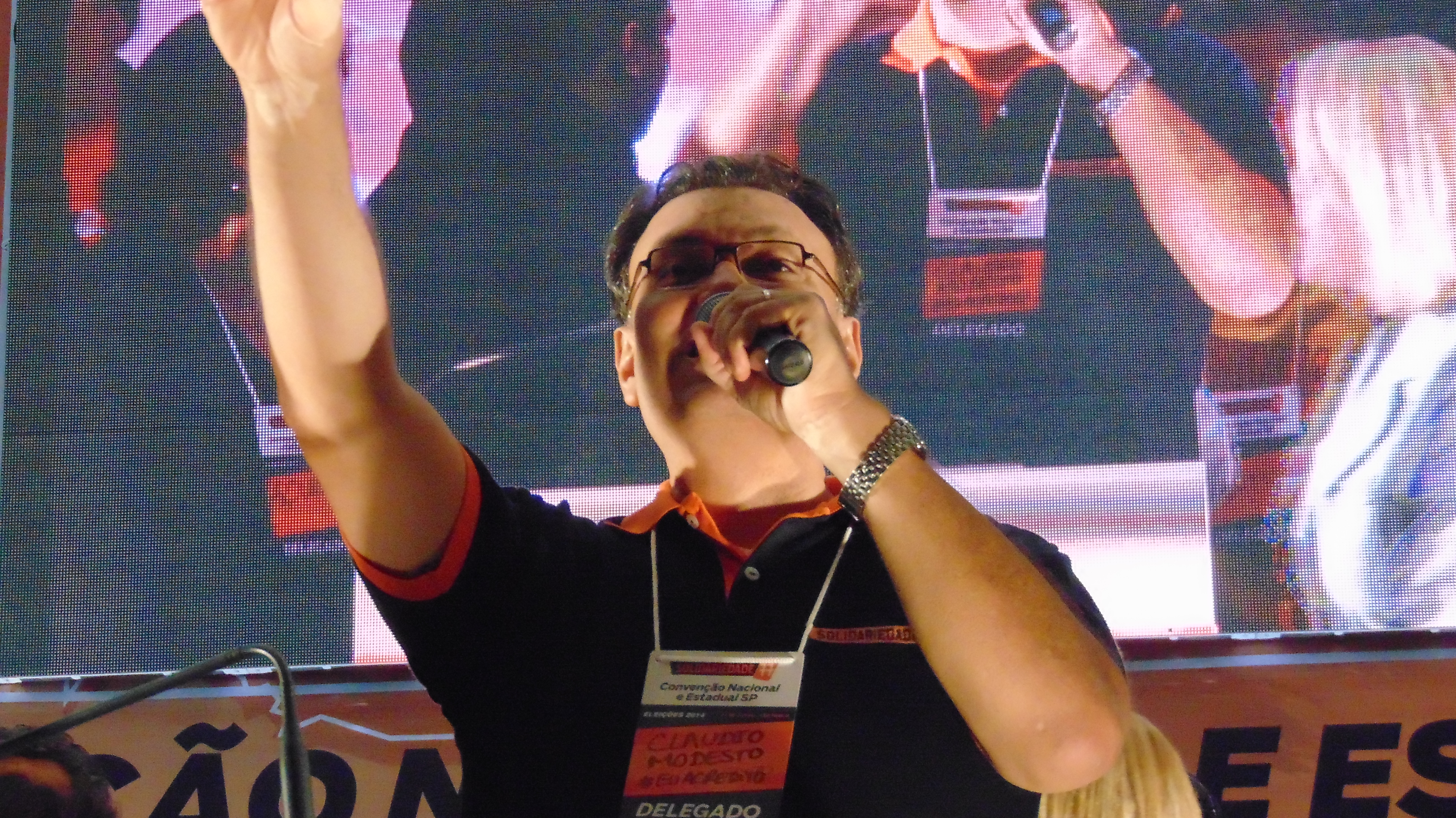
Claudio Modesto speaking at National and State of São Paulo Convention of the Solidarity party, 2014

== Politics and activism ==
A carrier of vitiligo disease since the age of 18, Modesto experienced the difficult access to treatment and medication existing in Brazil, where he became politically involved with the cause. In 2011 he joined the Democratic Labour Party where he ran for City Council of São Paulo and in 2014 he moved to the Solidarity party where he was one of the main candidates for Federal Deputy, also for the city of São Paulo.
