= Brooke Brodack =

American viral video comedian (born 1986)

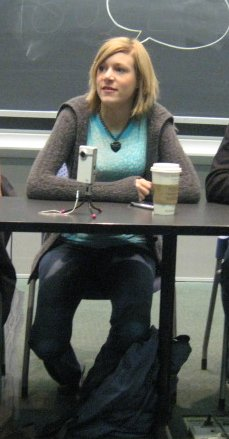
- Brodack at 2008 ROFLCon
- Born: Brooke Allison Brodack; April 7, 1986 (age 40); Putnam, Connecticut, U.S.
- Other name: Brooke Alley
- Years active: 2005–2018 (New channel is active)
- Known for: YouTube personality

YouTube information
- Channel: Brooke Brodack
- Genre: Vlog
- Subscribers: 64 thousand (2014)
- Views: ~50 million (2014)
- Last updated: April 19, 2026

Brooke Allison Brodack (born April 7, 1986), known online as Brookers, is one of the earliest YouTubers. Brodack, a receptionist from Holden, Massachusetts, first began uploading short comedy skits to YouTube in September 2005. She was offered a contract from NBC show host Carson Daly in 2006, before YouTubers were able to monetize their videos in December 2007, but nothing came of it. Brodack briefly had the most-subscribed YouTube channel for a period of 43 days from July 3, 2006, to August 15, 2006, during which it became the first channel to reach 10,000 subscribers. It was the first time the most subscribed YouTube channel was officially held by a channel of an individual woman. The New Yorker called her "the first real YouTube star" in a December 2006 article.

Brodack moved in with fellow YouTuber iJustine, but afterwards deleted her channel and moved to Vadodara, India. She relocated to Los Angeles in early 2017.

== Early life ==
Brodack was born in Putnam, Connecticut. She began making videos when she was nine years old. After graduating from Wachusett Regional High School, she attended Worcester State College, Quinsigamond Community College, and Mount Wachusett Community College, ultimately dropping out of all three. While living in Holden, Massachusetts with her mother and younger sister, Brodack worked as a receptionist and hostess at a Ninety Nine Restaurant and volunteered for NEADS Inc. in nearby Sterling, Massachusetts.

== Internet success ==
Brodack began posting her short comedic videos on her "Brookers" YouTube channel in September 2005. By June 2006, she was offered an 18-month development contract from Carson Daly, the host of a late night show on NBC, but nothing ever came of it. From July 3 to August 17, 2006, her "Brookers" channel was the most-subscribed on YouTube. She was named a "Crossover Star" by The Wall Street Journal on its New Media Power List on July 29, 2006.

Brodack directed, edited and performed in her early videos, most of which were set at her family home in Holden, Massachusetts. The New Yorker has called her videos "defiantly madcap." Her single-most popular video, "Crazed Numa Fan!!!!", a lip-sync parody of an earlier Internet meme, Numa Numa Dance by Gary Brolsma (itself a parody of "Dragostea din tei" by O-Zone), was viewed on YouTube over 8.2 million times. Her younger sister, Melissa "Missy" Brodack, performed alongside her in many videos, including "Crazed Numa Fan!!!!"

Her video "Chips," a spoof suspense drama about eating potato chips, was called "brilliant" by Entertainment Weekly, which has listed it among the "great moments in YouTube history."

From August 2006 to April 2007, she played a large role on a Daly-hosted, NBC-sponsored video contest website, It's Your Show TV, posting many videos there. She appeared on The Tyra Banks Show on December 6, 2006 as a judge for a student video competition. In February 2007, she appeared alongside other early YouTube stars in "The Sound of Your Voice," a viral music video for Barenaked Ladies.

From May 2007 to March 2008, Brodack had her own web channel, brookebrodack.tv, which was offered through www.me.tv, a new service Daly helped to found. She participated in the 777 (July 7, 2007) YouTube gathering in New York City. In November 2007, she released "Ozzy's Magical Glasses n' Stuff," a viral video advertisement for a live auction of Ozzy Osbourne items on the Auction Network, for which she was paid "a solid five figures" by the Palisades Media Group.

== Later life ==
From mid-2013 to early 2017, Brodack lived in Vadodara, India, working on video workshop lectures in collaboration with Design Infinium. As of February 2017, she lives in Los Angeles.

On July 12, 2017, Brodack deleted her YouTube account. She also deleted her Twitter and set her Instagram profile to private.

In mid-2018, she returned to YouTube on a new self-titled channel. This channel also no longer exists.

On December 11, 2018, Brodack created a new YouTube channel under her real name. As of May 2026, the channel had 2,090 subscribers.

== See also ==
- List of most-subscribed YouTube channels
- List of YouTubers
- History of YouTube

Honorary titles
Preceded by judsonlaipply	Most-subscribed YouTube channel July 3 – August 17, 2006	Succeeded by geriatric1927
