= List of most-followed Facebook pages =

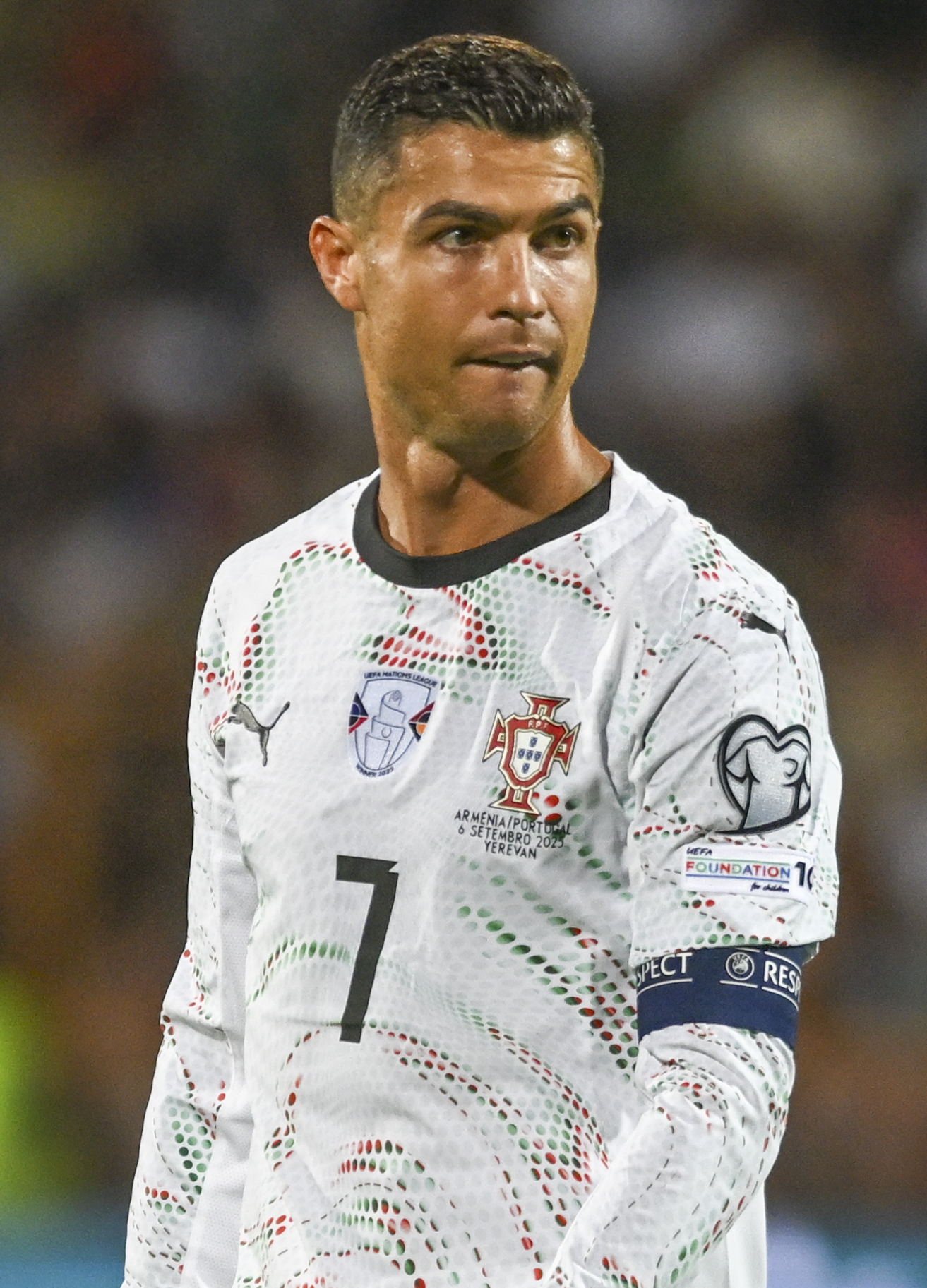
Cristiano Ronaldo is the second most-followed user on Facebook with 174 million followers.

Facebook's own page is the fourth most-followed on the platform with 154 million followers.

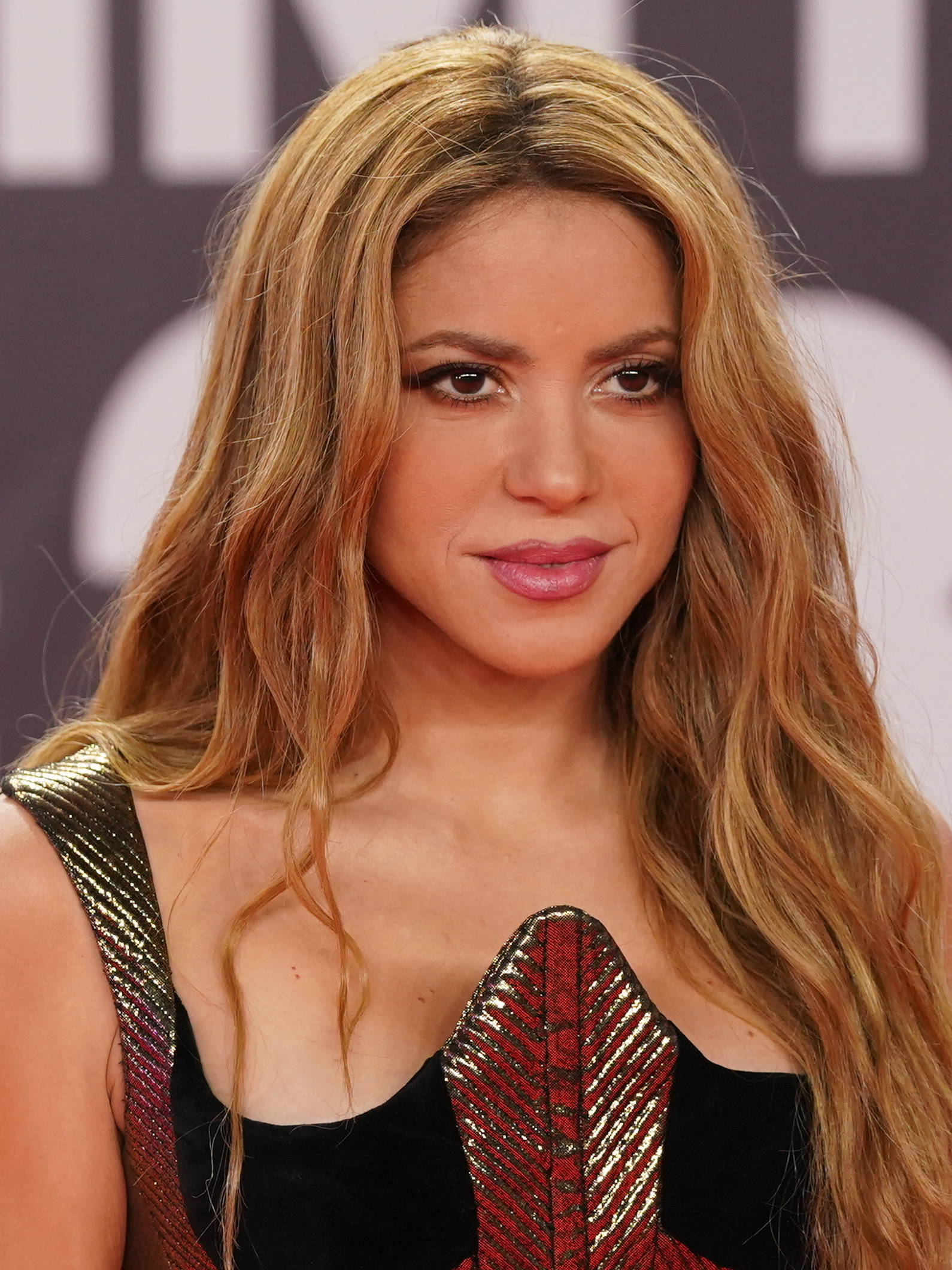
Shakira is the most-followed female individual user on Facebook with 126 million followers.

This article contains a list of the top 50 accounts with the largest number of followers on the social media platform Facebook. As of September 2026, the most-followed page is the American video on demand service Netflix, with over 205 million followers.

== Most-followed Facebook pages ==
The following table lists the 50 most-followed pages on Facebook as of August 28, 2026, with each total rounded down to the nearest million followers, as well as the description, and the country of origin of each page.

Rank	Page name	Followers (millions)	Description	Country
1	Netflix	205	Video on demand service	United States
2	Cristiano Ronaldo	174	Football player	Portugal
3	Samsung	162	Product and services	South Korea
4	Facebook	154	Social media platform	United States
5	5-Minute Crafts	147	Internet media	Cyprus
6	Mr. Bean	141	Fictional character	United Kingdom
7	Real Madrid C.F.	135	Football club	Spain
8	Shakira	126	Musician	Colombia
9	FC Barcelona	128	Football club	Spain
10	CGTN	125	State media	China
11	Lionel Messi	118	Football player	Argentina
12	Will Smith	113	Actor	United States
13	China Daily	110	State media	China
14	YouTube	108	Product and services	United States
15	Coca-Cola	107	Product and services	United States
16	Meta	106	Product and services	United States
17	Xinhua News Agency	103	State media	China
18	Rihanna	102	Musician	Barbados
19	Vin Diesel	102	Actor	United States
20	WWE	102	Wrestling competition	United States
21	Tasty	101	Internet media	United States
22	UEFA Champions League	95	European club football competition	Europe
23	La Liga	93	Spanish club football league	Spain
24	Eminem	92	Musician	United States
25	Neymar	92	Football player	Brazil
26	Justin Bieber	88	Musician	Canada
27	Manchester United	87	Football club	United Kingdom
28	Selena Gomez	84	Musician and actress	United States
29	People's Daily	83	State media	China
30	McDonald's	82	Product and services	United States
31	National Geographic TV	81	Television network	United States
32	Taylor Swift	78	Musician	United States
33	Global Times	77	State media	China
34	FC Bayern Munich	72	Football club	Germany
35	Jason Statham	72	Actor	United Kingdom
36	Blossom	71	Internet media	United States
37	Harry Potter	69	Film franchise	United Kingdom
38	Michael Jackson	69	Musician (postmortem)	United States
39	Katy Perry	69	Musician	United States
40	Instagram	68	Social media platform	United States
41	Jackie Chan	68	Actor	Hong Kong
42	Adele	67	Musician	United Kingdom
43	Dwayne Johnson	66	Actor and wrestler	United States
44	Bob Marley	65	Musician (postmortem)	Jamaica
45	Candy Crush Saga	65	Game	Sweden
46	T-Series	63	Music record label	India
47	BBC News	62	Broadcast media	United Kingdom
48	Narendra Modi	62	Prime Minister of India (2014–present)	India
49	Jennifer Lopez	60	Musician	United States
50	Manchester City	60	Football club	United Kingdom

== See also ==
- List of most-followed Instagram accounts
- List of most-followed X accounts
