= Judson Laipply =

American internet personality

- Laipply in 2008
- Born: March 22, 1976 (age 50); Bucyrus, Ohio, U.S.
- Occupations: Internet personality; speaker; comedian; dancer; YouTuber
- Years active: 2006–present
- Known for: Comedy dancing
- Notable work: Evolution of Dance (video); Evolution of Dance 2 (video); Might as Well Dance (book)

YouTube information
- Channel: Judson Laipply
- Genres: Dancing; Comedy
- Subscribers: 110 thousand
- Views: 319 million
- Last updated: April 13, 2026
- Website: JudsonLaipply.com

Judson Laipply (/ˈlaɪpli/ LYPE-lee; born March 22, 1976) is an American internet celebrity from Bucyrus, Ohio. He served as the state president of The Ohio Association of Student Councils from 1993 to 1994. He is best known for his performance in the "Evolution of Dance" viral video clip, which became one of the most famous YouTube videos ever and was the most-viewed YouTube video over three time periods from May 2006 to October 2009. He has worked as a public speaker since 2000. For a brief 21 day period from June 12, 2006, to July 3, 2006, his YouTube channel was the most subscribed YouTube channel, which made him the first male individual channel to officially hold the honor.

== "Evolution of Dance" ==
In 2003, Laipply originally performed "Evolution of Dance", at which time it consisted of 12 popular dance songs of the late 20th century. In the video which was later uploaded to YouTube on April 6, 2006, he is seen performing various dance moves on stage with a spot light pointing at him in under 8 minutes. At that time, it was rated on YouTube as:

- #1 Most Viewed All Time Video on YouTube.com
- #1 Top Rated Video on YouTube.com
- #3 Most Discussed Video on YouTube.com

It has since been surpassed by other videos.

=== Songs in "Evolution of Dance" ===
Song	Artist/Work	Duration	Released
"Hound Dog"	Elvis Presley	0:00–0:14	1956
"The Twist"	Chubby Checker	0:14–0:31	1960
"Stayin' Alive"	Bee Gees	0:31–0:38	1977
"Y.M.C.A."	The Village People	0:38–0:56	1978
"Kung Fu Fighting"	Carl Douglas	0:56–1:03	1974
"Keep On"	The Brady Bunch	1:03–1:17	1974
"Greased Lightnin'"	John Travolta	1:17–1:28	1978
"You Shook Me All Night Long"	AC/DC	1:28–1:42	1980
"Billie Jean"	Michael Jackson	1:42–1:49	1983
"Thriller"	Michael Jackson	1:50–1:58	1983
"Oompa Loompa"	Willy Wonka & the Chocolate Factory	1:58–2:04	1971
"Mr. Roboto"	Styx	2:04–2:14	1983
"Break Dance (Electric Boogie) Trip Theory Mix"	West Street Mob	2:14–2:28	1983
"Walk Like an Egyptian"	The Bangles	2:28–2:36	1986
"Chicken Dance"	Lawrence Welk	2:36–2:42	1982
"Mony Mony"	Billy Idol	2:42–2:57	1981
"Ice Ice Baby"	Vanilla Ice	2:57–3:11	1990
"U Can't Touch This"	MC Hammer	3:12–3:42	1990
"Love Shack"	The B-52's	3:42–3:46	1989
"Apache (Jump on it)"	Sugarhill Gang	3:46–4:03	1981
"Jump Around"	House of Pain	4:03–4:15	1992
"Baby Got Back"	Sir Mix-A-Lot	4:15–4:22	1992
"Tubthumping"	Chumbawamba	4:22–4:32	1997
"What Is Love"	Haddaway	4:32–4:40	1993
"Cotton-Eyed Joe"	Rednex	4:40–5:01	1994
"Macarena"	Los Del Rio	5:01–5:06	1995
"Bye Bye Bye"	'N Sync	5:06–5:29	2000
"Lose Yourself"	Eminem	5:29–5:33	2002
"Hey Ya!"	Outkast	5:33–5:39	2003
"Dirt off Your Shoulder"	Jay-Z	5:39–5:49	2004
"Ice Ice Baby" (Lyrics played: Yo, let's get out of here! Word to your mother)	Vanilla Ice	5:49–5:52	1990
"Bye Bye Bye" (Lyrics played: Bye, bye, bye)	'N Sync	5:52–6:00	2000

=== "Evolution of Dance 2" ===
The "Evolution of Dance 2" video, the sequel to the video sensation "Evolution of Dance" was released on December 17, 2008, as part of a national viral marketing campaign.

Song	Artist/Work	Duration	Released
"I Got You (I Feel Good)"	James Brown	0:10–0:30	1965
"My Girl"	The Temptations	0:30–0:39	1964
"Proud Mary"	Ike & Tina Turner	0:39–0:50	1971
"The Hustle"	Van McCoy and the Soul City Symphony	0:50–0:55	1975
"Hokey Pokey"	Ray Anthony	0:55–1:09	1950
"Shout"	The Isley Brothers	1:09–1:20	1959
"Tequila"	The Champs	1:21–1:30	1958
"I'm Gonna Be (500 Miles)"	The Proclaimers	1:31–1:38	1988
"Pump Up the Jam"	Technotronic	1:38–1:56	1989
"I'm Too Sexy"	Right Said Fred	1:56–2:11	1992
"Electric Boogie"	Marcia Griffiths	2:11–2:31	1989
"My Lovin' (You're Never Gonna Get It)"	En Vogue	2:31–2:42	1992
"Tootsee Roll"	69 Boyz	2:43–2:56	1994
"Cha Cha Slide"	DJ Casper	2:57–3:16	2000
"Lean Back"	Terror Squad	3.16–3.23	2004
"Here It Goes Again"	OK Go	3:23–3:32	2006
"London Bridge"	Fergie	3:32–3:42	2006
"Crank That (Soulja Boy)"	Soulja Boy	3:42–4:00	2007
"Shout" (Lyrics played: "Now, wait a minute")	The Isley Brothers	4:00–4:02	1959
"I'm Too Sexy" (Lyrics played: "I'm too sexy for this song")	Right Said Fred	4:02–4:05	1992

=== "Evolution of Dance 3" ===
This was announced by Judson on June 16, 2010; he stated that it was in its early stages and that it was too early to give any details. In a YouTube comment he claimed he was trying to incorporate much older music and possibly include a second dancer. It was uploaded in April 2016, to commemorate the 10th anniversary of "Evolution of Dance".

Song	Artist/Work	Duration	Released
"Johnny B. Goode"	Chuck Berry	0:05–0:13	1958
"Time Warp"	The Rocky Horror Picture Show	0:14–0:36	1975
"Born to Hand Jive"	Sha Na Na	0:36–0:56	1978
"Beat It"	Michael Jackson	0:56–1:13	1983
"Sweet Child O' Mine"	Guns N' Roses	1:13–1:30	1988
"Vogue"	Madonna	1:30–1:38	1990
"Hanging Tough"	New Kids on the Block	1:38–1:48	1988
"Rollin'"	Limp Bizkit	1:48–2:04	2000
"It's Not Unusual"	Tom Jones	2:04–2:20	1965
"Peanut Butter Jelly Time"	Chip-Man & The Buckwheat Boyz	2:20–2:31	2005
"Hips Don't Lie"	Shakira	2:31–2:41	2006
"Cupid Shuffle"	Cupid	2:41–2:54	2007
"Wobble"	V.I.C.	2:54–3:13	2008
"Stanky Legg"	GS Boyz	3:13–3:19	2008
"Single Ladies"	Beyoncé	3:19–3:31	2008
"Moving Like Berney"	ISA	3:31–3:38	2010
"Party Rock Anthem"	LMFAO	3:38–3:43	2011
"I'm Sexy and I Know It"	LMFAO	3:43–3:48	2011
"Call Me Maybe"	Carly Rae Jepsen	3:48–3:55	2011
"Gangnam Style"	PSY	3:55–4:06	2012
"Wrecking Ball"	Miley Cyrus	4:06–4:22	2013
"Watch Me"	Silento	4:22–4:29	2015
"Hit the Quan"	ILoveMemphis	4:29–4:37	2015
"Hotline Bling"	Drake	4:37–4:52	2015
"So Long, Farewell"	The Sound of Music	4:52–5:04	1965

== Popular culture ==
Laipply doing the "Evolution of Dance" at VidCon 2011 (with audio removed for copyright reasons)

In December 2007, Judson appeared in an advert on the BBC for the 'dance season' during the Christmas Holidays. "Evolution of Dance" was #1 on the show Rude Tube hosted by Alex Zane and Laipply was interviewed on the show. Judson was also featured in the music video for Weezer's song "Pork and Beans" along with several other Internet celebrities.

In February 2010, the video was used as a question reference on the game show Jeopardy! in the 2010 college championships. In "The Delivery" episode of The Office, Andy Bernard does the dance sans music as a way to distract Pam from her contractions. In 2011, Judson also appeared on Tosh.0, hosted by Daniel Tosh. The video has been parodied numerous times on The Tonight Show with Jimmy Fallon through variations such as "Evolution of Mom Dancing" (guest-starring Michelle Obama) or "Evolution of Hip-Hop Dancing" (guest-starring Will Smith) among others.

He did another video, called "The Evolution of the Touchdown Dance", which included memorable NFL touchdown dances, like "The Ickey Shuffle", Joe Horn's cell phone celebration, and famous celebrations from Terrell Owens and Chad Ochocinco. In December 2015, he appeared in YouTube's annual YouTube Rewind.

In October 2026, Laipply appeared as a cameo in Mozilla's Come Back to Firefox advertising campaign, alongside several other viral internet personalities from the 2000s and 2010s. The campaign used nostalgia for early internet culture to promote Firefox.

== See also ==
- Ireneusz Krosny, who posted his own "Evolution of Dance" clip
- List of most-subscribed YouTube channels
- List of most-viewed YouTube videos

Achievements
Preceded by Smosh	Most Subscribed Channel on YouTube; 2006–2006	Succeeded by Brookers
