= 5-Minute Crafts =

Cypriot YouTube channel and content farm

YouTube information
- Channel: 5-Minute Crafts
- Years active: 2016–present
- Genres: DIY; life hacks; how-to
- Subscribers: 80.5 million
- Views: 28.59 billion
- Last updated: 31 July 2026

5-Minute Crafts is a do it yourself (DIY)-style Russian-owned YouTube channel by TheSoul Group, based in Cyprus. As of July 2026, it is the 33rd most subscribed channel on the platform. The channel is also the 5th most-followed Facebook page.

The channel has drawn criticism for its unusual and potentially dangerous life hacks and its reliance on clickbait.

== Content ==
5-Minute Crafts' YouTube videos are compilations of videos previously posted on Instagram or Facebook. The channel's content consists largely of videos relating to crafts and life hacks, styled in how-to formats, and occasionally, science experiments. The channel's videos employ a style where a top-down camera displays objects on a solid-color surface while only a person's hands appear in the frame, making content with aid of these objects, usually food and DIY ingredients and tools.

== History ==
TheSoul Group was founded by Russia-based entrepreneurs Pavel Radaev and Marat Mukhametov, a team with backgrounds in social media content creation, who launched AdMe. In March 2017, the company founded the YouTube channel, Bright Side. On November 15, 2016, 5-Minute Crafts was registered on YouTube by TheSoul Group. The channel's first video, "5 essential DIY hacks that you need to know" was uploaded the following day.

In 2017, the channel's subscriber and video view counts started to grow rapidly. In an article published by Mic in June 2017, 5-Minute Crafts was noted to have accumulated over 4 million subscribers.

In April 2018, Tubefilter covered a trend regarding springtime cleaning videos on YouTube, noting 5-Minute Crafts' participation. By November, Vox wrote that 5-Minute Crafts was a "wildly successful" channel, citing its then over 10 billion video views and its ranking as the fifth most-subscribed channel on YouTube, having nearly 40 million subscribers at the time. During one week in December 2018, the channel received over 238 million video views.

In May 2020, 5-Minute Crafts created their first English-language channel on Pinterest. In July 2020, 5-Minute Crafts collaborated with Mattel for a custom brand campaign that included multiple DIY videos focused on family-friendly crafts and at-home activities.

In November, 2021, the channel celebrated its 5th anniversary on YouTube, with more than 1.7 billion hours watched and 21 billion views. That same month on November 18, 2021, Variety commented that the 5-Minute Crafts Family had the highest-performing YouTube Short to date with nearly 433 million views. As of January, 2022, the channel has 75.4 million subscribers, ranking it as the eleventh most-subscribed channel not operated by YouTube.

With a focus on DIY content, 5-Minute Crafts began to adapt its content for distribution on Pinterest. The activity began by establishing 5-Minute Crafts in English, Spanish and Portuguese. This collaboration with Pinterest was recognised by The Drum Awards for the Digital Industries 2021, winning the "Best use of Pinterest" award.

== Reception ==
The channel has drawn criticism for its unusual and potentially dangerous life hacks and its reliance on clickbait. Vox characterized 5-Minute Crafts as "bizarre", describing its content as "do-it-yourself-how-tos that no person could or should ever replicate", and criticizing the channel's heavy use of clickbait thumbnails. Mashable described the channel's videos as "nonsensical" and possibly a form of trolling, singling out a video which claimed to demonstrate how soaking an egg in vinegar and then maple syrup will make it "bigger than before".

BBC's Click criticized 5-Minute Crafts for its "fake kitchen hacks": when following the instructions of a video in which a fresh corncob produced popcorn when microwaved, the presenter found the cob was only warmed up. Ann Reardon of How to Cook That described clickbait recipe channels including 5-Minute Crafts as the "fake news of the baking world", and fact-checked several of their videos on her channel. In particular, she criticized a clip in which a strawberry was soaked in bleach to produce a "white strawberry", saying it would be dangerous if a child were to replicate it and eat the result.

== See also ==
- List of most-subscribed YouTube channels
- List of most-viewed YouTube channels
