= Elk Grove =

Elk Grove can refer to:

== Places in the United States ==
- Elk Grove, California, in Sacramento County
- Elk Grove, Humboldt County, California
- Elk Grove Village, Illinois
- Elk Grove, Wisconsin, a town
  - Elk Grove (community), Wisconsin, an unincorporated community

== See also ==
- Elk Grove Unified School District v. Newdow
