= Paulinho (footballer, born January 1993) =

Brazilian footballer

Personal information
- Full name: Paulo Modesto da Silva Júnior
- Date of birth: 7 January 1993 (age 33)
- Place of birth: Belo Horizonte, Brazil
- Height: 1.73 m (5 ft 8 in)
- Position: Defensive midfielder

Team information
- Current team: Atlético Mineiro
- Number: 41

Youth career
- Atlético Mineiro

Senior career*
| Years | Team | Apps | (Gls) |
| 2009–2015 | Atlético Mineiro | 4 | (0) |
| 2015 | América Mineiro | 1 | (0) |
| 2016 | Nacional | 0 | (0) |
| 2017 | Rio Negro | | |
| 2018 | Tupi | 3 | (0) |
| 2019 | Força e Luz | 4 | (0) |
- * Club domestic league appearances and goals

Paulo Modesto da Silva Júnior (born 7 January 1993), commonly known as Paulinho, is a Brazilian former footballer who played as a defensive midfielder.

== Career statistics ==
(Correct as of 8 December 2014)

| Club | Season | State League | | Brazilian Série A | | Copa do Brasil | | Copa Sudamericana | | Total | |
| Club | Season | Apps | Goals | Apps | Goals | Apps | Goals | Apps | Goals | Apps | Goals |
|---|---|---|---|---|---|---|---|---|---|---|---|
| Atlético Mineiro | 2009 | — | | 2 | 0 | — | | — | | 2 | 0 |
| Atlético Mineiro | 2014 | — | | 2 | 0 | — | | — | | 2 | 0 |
| Atlético Mineiro | Total | 0 | 0 | 4 | 0 | 0 | 0 | 0 | 0 | 4 | 0 |
| Total | | 0 | 0 | 4 | 0 | 0 | 0 | 0 | 0 | 4 | 0 |

== See also ==
- Football in Brazil
- List of football clubs in Brazil
