= Luccas Neto =

Brazilian actor and comedian (born 1992)

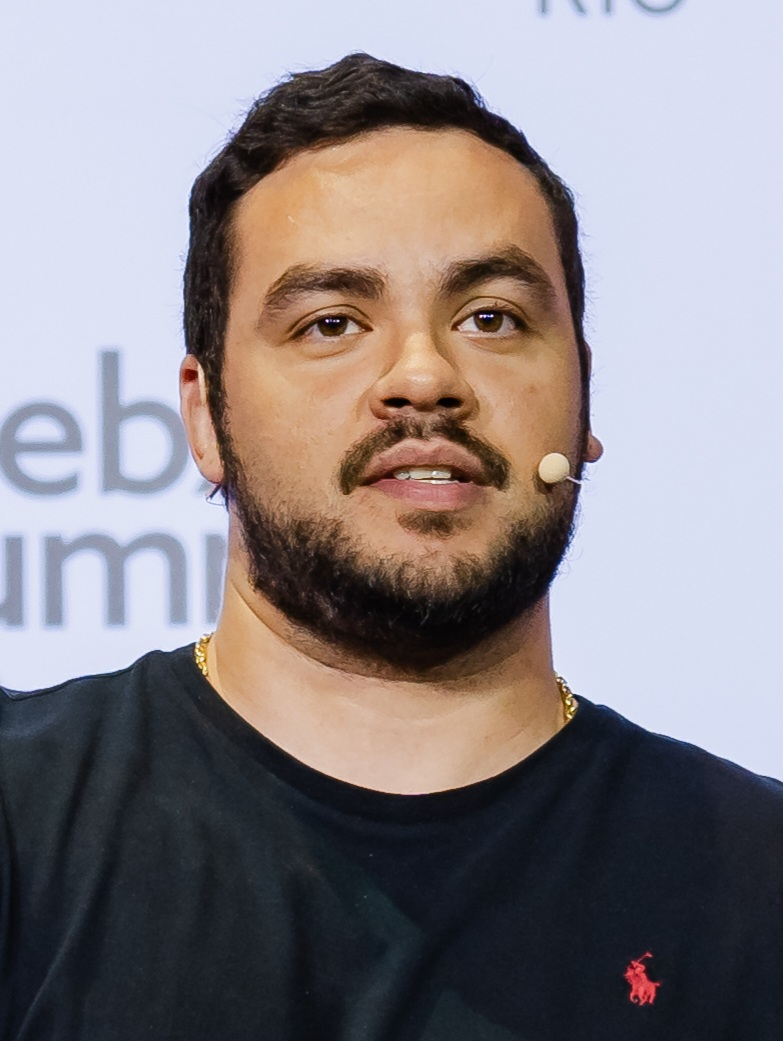
- Luccas in 2024
- Born: Luccas Neto Ferreira; February 8, 1992 (age 34); Rio de Janeiro, Brazil
- Occupations: YouTuber; actor; comedian
- Spouse: Jéssica Diehl (m. 2021)
- Relatives: Felipe Neto (brother)

YouTube information
- Channel: LUCCAS NETO
- Genres: Vlog; humor
- Subscribers: 53.6 million
- Views: 15.57 billion
- Last updated: September 7, 2026

Luccas Neto Ferreira (born February 8, 1992) is a Brazilian actor and comedian.

== Career ==
=== YouTube ===
On 10 February 2017, he uploaded his first video.

His channel reached 100,000 subscribers in 2016, 1,000,000 subscribers in 2017, and 10,000,000 subscribers also in 2017.

As of August 2026, his channel's total views add up to over 15 billion.
