= Adam Guild =

American technology entrepreneur (born 1999)

- Occupation: Entrepreneur
- Known for: Owner.com
- Awards: Forbes 30 under 30; 2021

Adam Guild (born 1999) is an American technology entrepreneur known for being the co-founder and CEO of Owner.com. His company provides an online infrastructure platform for restaurant operations.

Guild first got the idea for the technology startup after helping his mother's online dog-grooming business. He launched Owner.com in 2020 to help independent restaurants by giving them more control over their deliveries, customer data and overall business. Through its AI technology, he has increased their profit margins by reducing their reliance on high fee third-party food delivery apps. The company raised $120 million in 2025 and is valued at $1 billion.

Guild has been recognized in the Forbes 30 under 30 list and is a Thiel Fellow.
