= List of most-subscribed YouTube channels =

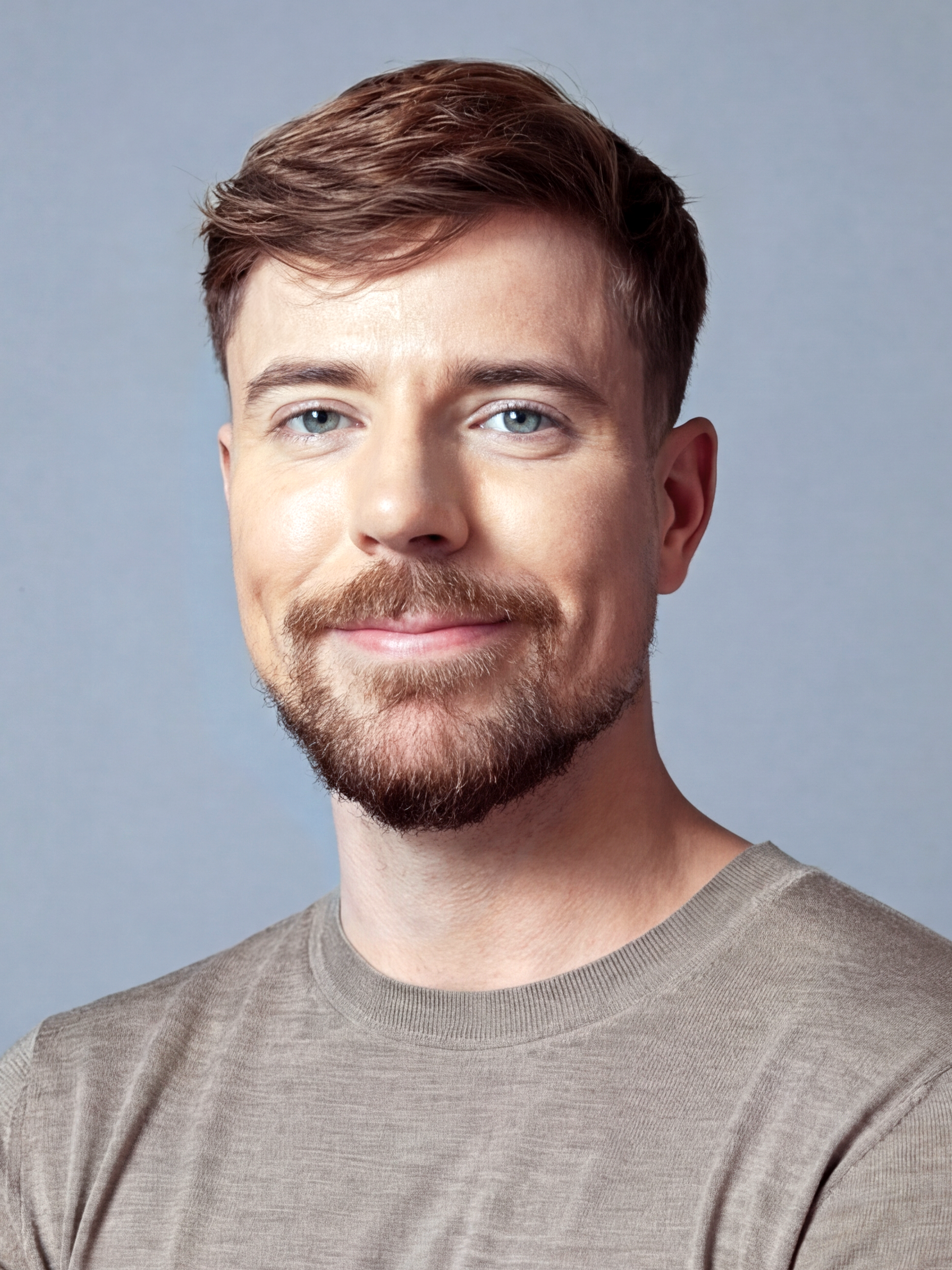
American YouTube personality MrBeast is the most-subscribed channel on YouTube, with 527 million subscribers as of November 2026.

A subscriber to a channel on the American video-sharing platform YouTube is a user with an account who chooses to follow a channel's content by clicking on that channel's "Subscribe" button, and each user's subscription feed consists of videos published by channels to which the user is subscribed. The ability for users to subscribe was introduced in October 2005. YouTube began publishing a list of its most-subscribed channels in April 2006. An early archive of the list dates to May 17, 2006. As of 2026, YouTube does not publish lists of most-subscribed channels.

Since May 2006, when Smosh occupied the top position with just 2,986 subscribers, at least 11 other YouTube channels have held the top spot; these include the channel for the American fictional web series lonelygirl15, American comedian Brooke "Brookers" Brodack, American fictional character Fred Figglehorn, Swedish gamer Felix "PewDiePie" Kjellberg, American comedian Ryan Higa, American media personality Ray William Johnson, American public speaker Judson Laipply, English pensioner Peter Oakley, and the official channels for Indian music record label T-Series, as well as YouTube (Note: Although now simply called "YouTube", YouTube's official channel was named "YouTube Spotlight" in 2013.) itself.

As of November 4, 2026, the most-subscribed YouTuber is MrBeast, having 525 million subscribers and gaining an average of around 175,000 subscribers per day.

== 100 most-subscribed channels ==
The following table lists the top followed 100 YouTube channels, (Note: The total number of channels listed may exceed 100 if a tie exists for the 100th-highest subscriber count.) as well as the primary language, country, date they joined YouTube, and content category of each channel. The channels are ordered by number of subscribers. Those whose displayed subscriber counts are identical, are listed so that the channel whose current growth rate indicates that its displayed subscriber count will exceed that of the other channel is listed first. Automatically generated channels that lack their own videos, such as Music and News, and channels that have been made effectively obsolete as a result of the transferral of their content, such as JustinBieberVEVO and TaylorSwiftVEVO (Note: These are not to be mistaken for the channels Justin Bieber and Taylor Swift, both of which are included.) are excluded.

As of June 2026, 36 of top 100 channels listed primarily produce content in English, 28 primarily in Hindi, and 11 primarily in Spanish. All 100 channels have surpassed 50 million subscribers. All Top 50 channels have surpassed 68 million subscribers. Seventeen of the channels have surpassed 100 million subscribers, of which three have surpassed 200 million (Cocomelon), two have surpassed 300 million (T-Series) and one has surpassed both 400 and 500 million (MrBeast).

Name	Link	Subscribers (millions)	Primary language	Category	Joined YouTube	Country
MrBeast	Link	527	English	Entertainment	February 19, 2012	United States
T-Series	Link	316	Hindi	Music	March 13, 2006	India
Cocomelon - Nursery Rhymes	Link	203	English	Education	September 1, 2006	United States
SET India	Link	190	Hindi	Entertainment	September 20, 2006	India
Vlad and Niki	Link	151	English	Entertainment	April 23, 2018	Russia
Stokes Twins	Link	150	English	People	April 11, 2008	United States; China
Kids Diana Show	Link	139	English	Entertainment	May 12, 2015	Ukraine
김프로KIMPRO	Link	135	Korean	People	November 11, 2017	South Korea
Like Nastya	Link	134	English	Entertainment	December 6, 2016	Russia
Alejo Igoa	Link	126	Spanish	Entertainment	January 17, 2014	Argentina
Zee Music Company	Link	123	Hindi	Music	March 12, 2014	India
WWE	Link	114	English	Sports	May 10, 2007	United States
Goldmines	Link	111	Hindi	Film	January 21, 2012	India
PewDiePie	Link	109	English	Entertainment/Lifestyle Vlogs	April 29, 2010	Japan; Sweden
Sony SAB	Link	106	Hindi	Entertainment	August 4, 2007	India
Alan's Universe	Link	104	English	Entertainment	February 3, 2020	United States
Blackpink	Link	102	Korean	Music	June 28, 2016	South Korea
Zee TV	Link	99.5	Hindi	Entertainment	December 11, 2005	India
ChuChu TV Nursery Rhymes & Kids Songs	Link	98.2	Hindi	Entertainment	February 9, 2013	India
Topper Guild	Link	96.1	English	Entertainment	July 8, 2014	United States
A4	Link	93.0	Russian	Entertainment	November 29, 2014	Belarus
KL BRO Biju Rithvik	Link	91.3	Malayalam	Lifestyle Vlogs	July 21, 2020	India
Mark Rober	Link	86.8	English	Education/Entertainment	October 20, 2011	United States
BANGTANTV	Link	86.5	Korean	Music	December 16, 2012	South Korea
Baby Shark - Pinkfong Kids’ Songs & Stories	Link	85.4	English	Entertainment	December 13, 2011	South Korea
ZAMZAM BROTHERS OFFICIAL	Link	85.0	Urdu	Entertainment	December 19, 2020	United Arab Emirates
UR · Cristiano	Link	83.8	Portuguese, English	Entertainment/Sports	July 8, 2024	Portugal
T-Series Bhakti Sagar	Link	83.7	Hindi	Music	February 13, 2011	India
Hybe Labels	Link	83.3	Korean	Music	June 4, 2008	South Korea
Toys and Colors	Link	83.2	English	Entertainment	March 17, 2016	United States
Tips Official	Link	82.8	Hindi	Entertainment	May 22, 2007	India
Colors TV	Link	82.7	Hindi	Entertainment	June 13, 2008	India
Fede Vigevani	Link	82.2	Spanish	Entertainment	June 16, 2009	Mexico; Uruguay
Zhong	Link	81.6	English	Entertainment	January 19, 2015	United States; China
5-Minute Crafts	Link	80.5	English	How-to	November 15, 2016	Cyprus (Note: TheSoul Publishing is currently based in Cyprus; it was originally based in Russia and is still Russian-owned.)
Justin Bieber	Link	79.7	English	Music	January 15, 2007	Canada
Bispo Bruno Leonardo	Link	77.7	Portuguese	Nonprofit	April 10, 2016	Brazil
Anaya Kandhal	Link	76.8	Hindi	Entertainment	September 19, 2016	United States
Aaj Tak	Link	75.7	Hindi	News	August 27, 2009	India
ISSEI / いっせい	Link	75.6	Japanese	Comedy	July 23, 2014	Japan
Shemaroo Filmi Gaane	Link	75.2	Hindi	Music	June 11, 2010	India
HAR PAL GEO	Link	74.6	Urdu	Entertainment	January 2, 2008	Pakistan
Sony Music India	Link	73.8	Hindi	Music	September 2, 2009	India
YRF	Link	73.1	Hindi	Music	June 7, 2006	India
Infobells - Hindi	Link	72.9	Hindi	Entertainment	June 6, 2014	India
El Reino Infantil	Link	71.7	Spanish	Music	June 2, 2011	Argentina
YOLO AVENTURAS	Link	71.5	Spanish	Entertainment	December 13, 2018	Mexico; Venezuela
Wave Music	Link	71.1	Bhojpuri	Music	December 20, 2011	India
ARY Digital HD	Link	68.9	Urdu	Entertainment	July 11, 2016	Pakistan
Canal KondZilla	Link	68.2	Portuguese	Music	March 21, 2012	Brazil
Celine Dept	Link	68.2	English	Sports	May 3, 2023	Belgium
Eminem Music	Link	67.5	English	Music	February 8, 2007	United States
Dangal TV Channel	Link	67.1	Hindi	Entertainment	August 2, 2017	India
Movieclips	Link	66.9	English	Film	April 27, 2006	United States
Saregama Music	Link	65.8	Hindi	Music	January 4, 2013	India
Taylor Swift	Link	63.5	English	Music	September 20, 2006	United States
MrBeast 2	Link	63.4	English	Entertainment	August 21, 2020	United States
IShowSpeed	Link	63.2	English	Entertainment	March 21, 2016	United States
Dude Perfect	Link	62.9	English	Comedy	March 17, 2009	United States
LooLoo Kids - Nursery Rhymes and Children's Songs	Link	62.8	English	Music	August 5, 2014	Romania
MrBeast Gaming	Link	62.7	English	Gaming	April 7, 2020	United States
Shemaroo	Link	62.4	Hindi	Entertainment	September 1, 2007	India
PANDA BOI	Link	62.3	English	Gaming	December 5, 2020	Italy
आचार्य प्रशान्त - Acharya Prashant	Link	61.2	Hindi	Education	August 27, 2014	India
Alfredo Larin	Link	60.8	Spanish	Entertainment	April 9, 2017	El Salvador
Маша и Медведь (Note: Masha and the Bear)	Link	60.8	Russian	Education	May 31, 2011	Russia
SonyMusicIndiaVEVO	Link	60.2	Hindi	Music	September 2, 2009	India
Ed Sheeran	Link	59.3	English	Music	August 8, 2006	United Kingdom
ToRung	Link	59.0	Vietnamese	Comedy	October 18, 2017	Vietnam
Billie Eilish	Link	58.7	English	Music	February 6, 2013	United States
Marshmello	Link	58.7	English	Music	April 6, 2015	United States
Mikecrack	Link	58.7	Spanish	Gaming	July 13, 2015	Spain
JioHotstar Kids	Link	58.5	Hindi	Entertainment	November 23, 2016	India
Ariana Grande	Link	58.4	English	Music	January 21, 2007	United States
Natan por Aí	Link	58.0	Portuguese	Entertainment	February 12, 2017	Brazil
Billion Surprise Toys	Link	57.6	English	Education	October 25, 2013	United Arab Emirates
Get Movies	Link	57.2	Russian	Entertainment	December 16, 2006	Russia
Juan de Dios Pantoja	Link	57.0	Spanish	People	June 9, 2014	Mexico
JuegaGerman	Link	57.0	Spanish	Gaming	May 18, 2013	Chile
shfa	Link	56.9	Arabic	People	March 29, 2015	United Arab Emirates
StarPlus	Link	56.8	Hindi	Entertainment	May 19, 2006	India
Masha and the Bear	Link	55.7	English	Film	September 17, 2014	Russia
HUM TV	Link	55.7	Urdu	Entertainment	May 25, 2011	Pakistan
ABS-CBN Entertainment	Link	55.4	Filipino	Entertainment	July 15, 2008	Philippines
Sierra & Rhia FAM	Link	55.1	English	Entertainment	February 5, 2020	Canada
Jess No Limit	Link	54.6	Indonesian	Gaming	September 6, 2017	Indonesia
Shakira	Link	54.6	Spanish	Music	October 16, 2005	Colombia
shfa2 - شفا	Link	54.5	Arabic	People	November 6, 2017	United Arab Emirates
T-Series Bollywood Classics	Link	54.3	Hindi	Film	April 2, 2012	India
Ishtar Music	Link	54.2	Hindi	Music	September 22, 2005	India
MR. INDIAN HACKER	Link	54.1	Hindi	Entertainment	Jun 21, 2012	India
Karla Bustillos	Link	54.0	Spanish	Entertainment	July 25, 2019	Mexico
Techno Gamerz	Link	53.9	Hindi	Gaming	August 13, 2017	India
LUCCAS NETO	Link	53.6	Portuguese	Entertainment	July 30, 2014	Brazil
Bad Bunny	Link	53.4	Spanish	Music	June 8, 2014	Puerto Rico
BEN EAGLE	Link	53.1	Vietnamese	Entertainment	August 9, 2021	Vietnam
Real fools shorts official	Link	52.9	Hindi	People	June 14, 2021	India
BeatboxJCOP	Link	52.5	Korean	Entertainment	March 12, 2011	South Korea
BETER BÖCÜK	Link	52.1	Turkish	Gaming	December 13, 2012	Turkey
Ben Azelart	Link	52.0	English	Entertainment	June 5, 2014	United States
As of November 2026

== Historical progression of most-subscribed channels ==
The following table lists the 20 distinct runs as the most-subscribed YouTube channel recorded since May 2006. Only runs lasting at least 24 hours are included. Twelve different channels have held the position, with PewDiePie holding the title a record four times. He also holds the records for the longest time as the most-subscribed channel (1,920 days in his third run), the shortest time as the most-subscribed channel (four days in his second run), and the longest overall combined time as the most subscribed channel (2,017 days). In second place is Smosh, which held it three times, while third place is tied between nigahiga, T-Series, and YouTube's own channel, which have all held it twice each. YouTube's own official channel, then known as "YouTube Spotlight", briefly held the title in late 2013; one factor that contributed to the channel's rise to the top spot was the site's autosuggestion for new users to subscribe to the channel upon registration.

Overall of the twelve channels who have held the record, seven featured individual males (including MrBeast (Note: Though Jimmy Donaldson founded the MrBeast channel in 2012, initially operating it himself, the channel has since expanded. It is now operated by a team led by Donaldson and has referred to itself as "the largest YouTube brand in the world". Due to this, the channel is included as among both the seven featuring individual males and the three that have been operated by brands.)); one (Brookers) featured an individual female; three have been operated by brands as opposed to individuals (T-Series, YouTube Spotlight, and MrBeast); one (Smosh) was a duo of males which later became a collective and production company; and one (lonelygirl15) was a web series. Nine of the channels were based in the United States, one (geriatric1927) was based in England, one (T-Series) was based in India, and one (PewDiePie) was based in Sweden, and later in England.

Former record for days held
Current record for days held

Channel name	Date achieved	Days held	Ref.(s)
Smosh (1)	c. May 9, 2006	~34	
Judson Laipply	c. June 12, 2006	~21	
Brookers	c. July 3, 2006	~43	
geriatric1927	August 15, 2006	28	
lonelygirl15	September 12, 2006	226	
Smosh (2)	April 26, 2007	517	
nigahiga (1)	September 24, 2008	12	
FЯED	October 6, 2008	318	
nigahiga (2)	August 20, 2009	675	
Ray William Johnson	June 26, 2011	564	
Smosh (3)	January 12, 2013	215	
PewDiePie (1)	August 15, 2013	79	
YouTube Spotlight (1)	November 2, 2013	36	
PewDiePie (2)	December 8, 2013	4	
YouTube Spotlight (2)	December 12, 2013	11	
PewDiePie (3)	December 23, 2013	1,920	
T-Series (1)	March 27, 2019 (Note: T-Series surpassed PewDiePie in subscriber count on numerous occasions, each lasting fewer than 24 hours, from February to late March 2019. The first incident to last at least 24 hours began on March 27 and ended on April 1.)	5	
PewDiePie (4)	April 1, 2019	13	
T-Series (2)	April 14, 2019	1,876	
MrBeast	June 2, 2024	903	
As of November 2026 UTC

=== Timeline ===
Timeline of the most-subscribed YouTube channels (May 2006 – present)

== Milestones and reactions ==
Channel	Subscriber milestone	Date achieved	Reference
Brookers	10,000	July 7, 2006	
geriatric1927	20,000	August 18, 2006	
lonelygirl15	50,000	October 13, 2006	
Smosh	100,000	May 15, 2007	
FЯED	1 million	April 7, 2009	
nigahiga	2 million	March 13, 2010	
RayWilliamJohnson	5 million	November 15, 2011	
Smosh	10 million	May 25, 2013	
PewDiePie	20 million	January 9, 2014	
PewDiePie	50 million	December 8, 2016	
T-Series	100 million	May 29, 2019	
T-Series	200 million	November 30, 2021	
MrBeast	300 million	July 10, 2024	
MrBeast	400 million	June 1, 2025	
MrBeast	500 million	June 12, 2026	

Following the third time that Smosh became the most-subscribed YouTube channel, Ray William Johnson collaborated with the duo. A flurry of top YouTubers including Ryan Higa, Shane Dawson, Felix Kjellberg, Michael Buckley, Kassem Gharaibeh, the Fine Brothers, and Johnson himself, congratulated the duo shortly after they surpassed Johnson as the most-subscribed channel.

=== PewDiePie vs T-Series ===
In mid-2018, the subscriber count of the Indian music video channel T-Series rapidly approached that of Swedish web comedian and Let's Player PewDiePie, who was the most-subscribed user on YouTube at the time. As a result, fans of PewDiePie and T-Series, other YouTubers, and celebrities showed their support for both channels. During the competition, both channels gained a large number of subscribers at a rapid rate, and surpassed each other's subscriber count on multiple occasions in early 2019. T-Series eventually permanently surpassed PewDiePie, and on May 29, 2019, it became the first channel to reach 100 million subscribers.

In 2024, when MrBeast surpassed T-Series, he tweeted that his fans had "avenged" PewDiePie. In the lead-up to MrBeast's channel becoming the most-subscribed, T-Series issued a call for subscribers. Meanwhile, MrBeast urged his fans to not see the competition between his channel and T-Series as "this country versus that country", while also warning against anyone becoming hateful.

== See also ==
- List of most-viewed YouTube channels
- List of most-viewed YouTube videos
- List of most-liked YouTube videos
- List of most-disliked YouTube videos
- List of YouTubers
