= Owner.com =

American tech company

- Industry: Technology, Restaurant Tech
- Founded: 2020
- Founders: Adam Guild and Dean Bloembergen
- Headquarters: Palo Alto, California
- Area served: United States
- Website: https://www.owner.com/

Owner.com (earlier known as ProfitBoss, Placepull) is an American software-as-a-service company that provides an online food ordering system to independent restaurants in the United States. It offers tools for website and app creation, CRM, loyalty program, marketing automation, and commission-free ordering, with a focus on helping restaurants own their digital presence.

== Overview ==
The company was started as ProfitBoss in 2018 to help restaurants build in-store traffic. Co-founders Adam Guild and Dean Bloembergen renamed the company to Owner.com in 2021, with its headquarters in Palo Alto, California. By 2021, the company had transactions of more than $18 million and by 2022, it operated in 49 states in the United States, working with more than 1,500 restaurants.

=== Funding ===
Owner.com has raised a total of $178.7 million since its founding. The company had an initial funding of $10.7 million in a seed round led by SaaStr Fund and in March 2022, it raised $15 million in a Series A round led by Altman Capital. In January 2024, it raised $33 million in Series B funding from Redpoint Ventures and Altman Capital with participation from Horsley Bridge, Activant Capital and Transpose Platform Management.

In May 2025, the company raised $120 million in Series C funding from Meritech Capital Partners and Headline, valuing Owner.com at $1 billion.

Some notable angel investors of the company include Sean Rad, Naval Ravikant, Kimbal Musk and others.

== Technology ==
The company provides a digital infrastructure through a software for online order management, delivery operations and recruitment. The software also facilitates the acquisition of customer data which provides the restaurants owners with insights to conduct online marketing campaigns. In addition, it provides a website builder, an AI-enabled email marketer, a branded mobile app generator and customer relationship management tools for the restaurants.

Owner.com has helped independent restaurants increase their profit margins by reducing the third-party delivery apps fees.
