= Katya Adushkina =

Russian videoblogger (born 2003)

- Born: Ekaterina Romanovna Adushkina; October 18, 2003 (age 23); Moscow, Russia

Ekaterina Romanovna (Katya) Adushkina (Russian: Екатери́на Рома́новна (Ка́тя) А́душкина; born 18 October 2003, Moscow) is a Russian videoblogger, singer and dancer. She is one of the most popular bloggers on the Russian-language version of YouTube. She was the winner of the first season of the show "Mask. Dances" on STS, where she performed as a zebra.

== Biography ==
Ekaterina Romanovna Adushkina was born on October 18, 2003, in Moscow.

== Awards and nominations ==
| Year | Award | Nomination | Nominee | Result | Ref. |
|---|---|---|---|---|---|
| 2017 | «Девочка года» (в рамках церемонии «Девичник Teens Awards 2017») | Blogger of the year | Katya Adushkina | Won | |
| 2018 | Nickelodeon Kids’ Choice Awards | The favorite internet star of Russian viewers | Katya Adushkina | Nominated | |
| 2018 | «Дай пять!» | Favorite Blogger | Katya Adushkina | Won | |
| 2019 | Nickelodeon Kids' Choice Awards | Favorite Russian music blogger | Katya Adushkina | Won | |
| 2019 | «Женщина года» | Breakthrough of the year | Katya Adushkina | Won | |
| 2020 | Nickelodeon Kids' Choice Awards | Favorite musical performer of Russian audiences | Katya Adushkina | Nominated | |
| 2021 | Nickelodeon Kids' Choice Awards | Russian viewers' favorite "ship" of the year | Katya Adushkina & Semyon Kim | Nominated | |
| 2022 | Премия RU.TV 2022 | Musical Blogger | Katya Adushkina | Номинация | |
