= KL Bro Biju =

Indian YouTuber

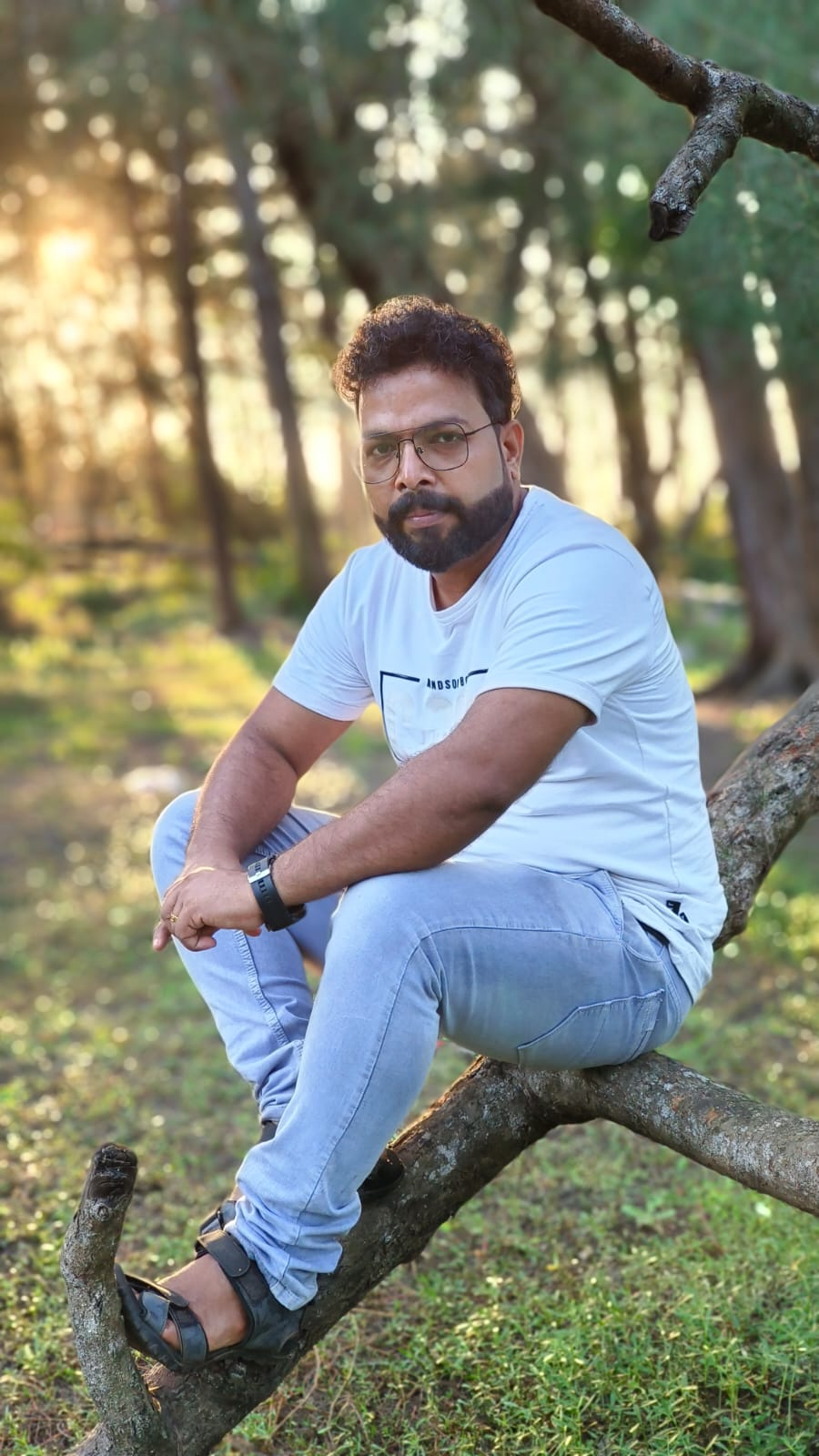
- KL Bro Biju in 2024
- Born: Biju; Mayyil, Kannur, Kerala
- Other name: KL Bro Biju
- Occupation: YouTuber
- Years active: 2020–present
- Known for: Family lifestyle vlogs
- Spouse: Kavitha Biju (m. 2015)
- Children: 2

YouTube information
- Channel: KL BRO Biju Rithvik
- Genres: Family vlogs; shorts videos
- Subscribers: 90.5 million
- Views: 114.20 billion
- Last updated: 10 December 2025
- Website: klbro.com

Biju is an Indian YouTuber known for his YouTube channel, KL BRO Biju Rithvik. He is the most subscribed individual youtuber in Asia. He also received India's first Ruby Creator play button for an individual in 2024 by surpassing 50 million subscribers. He is known for his family vlogs in shot video type. KL BRO BIJU has been selected as the number one youtube creators in India 2025..In 2026, his channel crossed 10,000 crores of total views on YouTube.

== Channel ==
A YouTube short by KL Bro Biju holds the record for the most viewed Indian individual YouTube channel video, with his videos also occupying the second, third, and fourth places on the list.

As of 2024, KL Bro Biju's channel has over 42 million regular viewers. According to The Lallantop, his channel is the biggest YouTube channel in India.

In March 2024, his channel surpassed CarryMinati in subscriber count, making him the Indian YouTuber with the highest number of subscribers.

In 2024, YouTube India presented KL Bro Biju with Ruby Play Button, awarded to creators who reach 50 million subscribers, at an event in Delhi.
