= Alejo Igoa =

Argentine YouTuber (born 1996)

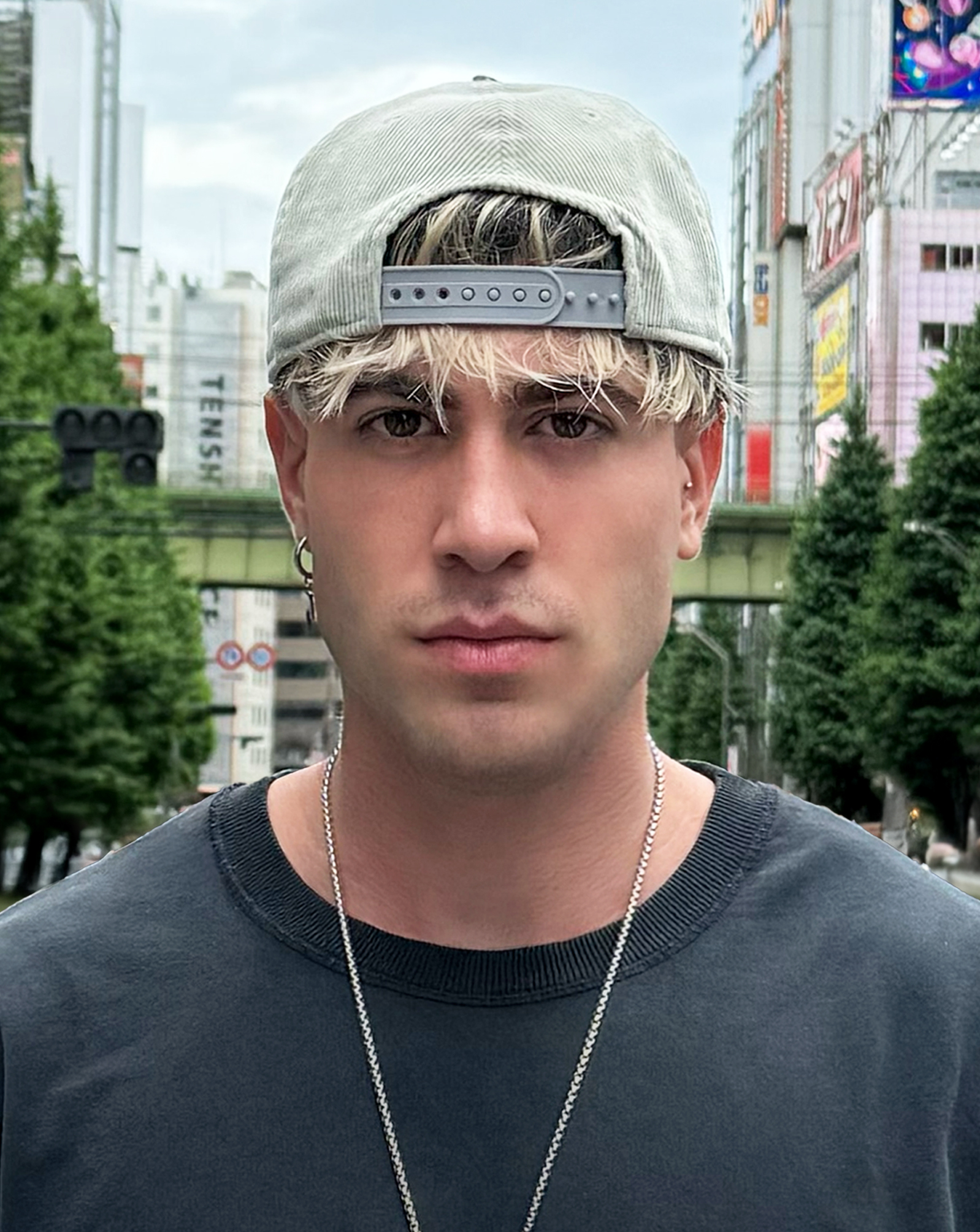
- Igoa in 2024
- Born: 23 August 1996 (age 30); Posadas, Misiones, Argentina
- Education: National University of Rosario (dropped out)
- Occupation: YouTuber

YouTube information
- Channel: Alejo Igoa
- Years active: 2014–present
- Genres: Entertainment; vlog
- Subscribers: 125 million
- Views: 38 billion
- Last updated: 6 Nov 2026

Alejo Igoa (born 23 August 1996) is an Argentine YouTuber. He is the most-subscribed Spanish-language creator on YouTube, with more than 125 million subscribers.

In March 2026, Igoa was recognized by Guinness World Records with two records: most subscribers for a Spanish-language channel on YouTube and most subscribers for a Spanish-language entertainment channel on YouTube.

That same year, he performed El Show de Alejo Igoa at the Movistar Arena in Buenos Aires, drawing more than 70,000 attendees across seven sold-out shows.

He has the 11th-most-subscribed YouTube channel worldwide.

== Early life and education ==
Igoa was born on 23 August 1996 in Posadas, Misiones. He grew up in a middle-class household in Concepción de la Sierra. At school, he was introverted and bullied. Igoa stated that spending his time frequently alone helped him to learn how to edit videos, design and use programs.

He studied architecture at the National University of Rosario for a year before dropping out. He sought employment to cover his living expenses but did not receive any job offers.

== Career and Personal Life ==
Igoa moved to Buenos Aires, using his savings to pay for two months' rent in a studio apartment. He created his YouTube channel in 2014, uploading his first video Solo Se Vos Mismo (lit. 'Just Be Yourself') after having received a camera as a birthday present from his parents. He was inspired by YouTubers from other countries, especially from the United States.

In April 2015, he participated in the first edition of the Club Media Fest in Buenos Aires, at which point his channel had reached 200,000 subscribers. That same year, the Israeli Ministry of Tourism provided him with a week long trip to Tel Aviv and Jerusalem to promote the country's tourism.

Igoa received a nomination in the "Digital Revelation" category at the 2016 Nickelodeon Argentina Kids' Choice Awards and made a brief appearance on the Nickelodeon show Kally's Mashup. To expand his international audience, Igoa moved to Mexico City at the end of 2017, where he lived for five months.

At the 2019 Martín Fierro Awards, he won in the Best YouTuber of the Year category. In 2022, he received the Diamond Play Button and won the Digital Leader award at the Eliot Awards. At the 2023 Martín Fierro Awards, he again won in the Best YouTuber of the Year category. In December 2023, he became the first Argentine YouTuber to surpass 30 million subscribers. In 2025, he became the most-subscribed to Spanish-speaking YouTuber.

In April 2026, Igoa performed El Show de Alejo Igoa at the Movistar Arena in Buenos Aires, where more than 70,000 people attended seven sold-out performances. During one of the shows, he was presented with two Guinness World Records: most subscribers for a Spanish-language channel on YouTube and most subscribers for a Spanish-language entertainment channel on YouTube.

As of May 2026, Alejo Igoa is the most-subscribed Spanish-language creator on YouTube and one of the most-subscribed YouTube channels worldwide.

== Awards and nominations ==
Year	Award	Category	Result	Ref.
2016	Kids' Choice Awards Argentina	Digital Revelation	Nominated	
2017	Martín Fierro Awards	Best of the most viewed on YouTube	Nominated	
2018	MTV MIAW Awards	God level Instagrammer: Argentina	Nominated	
2019	Martín Fierro Awards	Best YouTuber of the Year	Won	
2022	Eliot Awards	Digital Leader	Won	
2023	Martín Fierro Awards	Best YouTuber of the Year	Won	
2026	Guinness World Records	Most subscribers for a Spanish-language channel on YouTube	Won	
2026	Guinness World Records	Most subscribers for a Spanish-language entertainment channel on YouTube	Won	
