= YouPIX =

youPIX
- Website type: Website about internet and social media
- Available in: Portuguese
- Owner: Bia Granja
- Website: youpix.com.br
- Commercial: No
- Registration: None
- Launched: 2006

youPIX is a platform focused on discussing internet culture and how youth use the internet to create cultural, social movements and information. It was created by Bob Wollheim and Bia Granja in 2006.

The platform has a daily update site, social networks, studies on behavior of digital youth made in partnership with IBOPE, awards and the festival. One of the main achievements of youPIX is that it had more than 14 national and international editions.

== History ==
The youPIX platform was born as a pocket size print magazine in 2006, and was originally called PIX Magazine. It featured a curation of internet events and of the universe of blogs, in addition to articles about the behavior of Brazilian young Internet users.

At the beginning of 2009, the site youPIX.com.br was launched. The site also includes Memepedia, the first encyclopedia of Brazilian memes. In May 2013, the site became part of Portal iG.

In March 2009, the youPIX Festival, considered the largest festival about Brazilian internet culture, occurred.

In addition to the magazine and the festival, the youPIX platform also has two distinctive awards aimed at stimulating the content production and expression of the youth in the network: the "Best of the Websphere" award and the "Content Talent Show" contest (the latter aimed at new talents in the area of blogs, vlogs and podcasts).

In 2013, youPIX Tank, a partnership of youPIX and IBOPE Media, was inaugurated to carry out exclusive studies on the digital behavior of Brazilian youth.

== The festival ==
Since 2009, 14 youPIX Festival editions have been held, with twelve editions in Brazil, one in Spain and one in the United States. The event is free and the latest São Paulo edition, held in July 2013, received 17,000 participants and more than 150 hours of content.

More than 500 national and international speakers have already spoken at the various iterations of the event, as Gilberto Gil, Cristovam Buarque, Marcelo Tas, Silvio Meira, Felipe Neto, Helio de la Peña, Caio Tulio Costa, Rosana Hermann, PC Siqueira, Alessandro Molon, Preta Gil, Tobias Andersson, Christopher "M00t" Poole (founder of 4chan), Ben Huh (CEO of Cheezburger), Jamie Wilkinson, Raymond Chan (founder of 9GAG), Anthony Volodkin (founder of The Hype Machine), among others.
