= List of most-viewed YouTube channels =

Indian record label T-Series is the most-viewed YouTube channel, with over 343 billion views.

The list of most-viewed YouTube channels is topped by T-Series, an Indian record label known for Hindi film music. T-Series became the most-viewed YouTube channel on February 16, 2017, and has over 343 billion total views as of June 2026.

== 50 most-viewed channels ==
The following table lists the 50 most-viewed YouTube channels as well as the primary language and content category of each channel as of June 2026. The channels are ordered by number of views. The top 50 most-viewed channels have all surpassed 49 billion total views.

Rank	Channel name	Link	Network	Views (billions)	Content category	Country	Primary language(s)
1	T-Series	Link	T-Series	350	Music	India	Hindi
2	Cocomelon - Nursery Rhymes	Link	Moonbug Entertainment	222.4	Education	United States	English
3	SET India	Link	Culver Max Entertainment	188.8	Entertainment	India	Hindi
4	김프로KIMPRO	Link	—	144.1	People	South Korea	Korean
5	Sony SAB	Link	Culver Max Entertainment	143.7	Entertainment	India	Hindi
6	MrBeast	Link	—	137.2	Entertainment	United States	English
7	Kids Diana Show	Link	AIR	124.5	Entertainment	Ukraine	English
8	Vlad and Niki	Link	—	121.2	Entertainment	Russia	English
9	Like Nastya	Link	Yoola	121	Entertainment	Russia	Russian and English
10	Toys and Colors	Link	—	119	Entertainment	United States	English
11	Zee TV	Link	Zee Entertainment Enterprises	117	Entertainment	India	Hindi
12	Anaya Kandhal	Link	__	105	Entertainment	India	Hindi
13	WWE	Link	WWE	104.5	Entertainment	United States	English
14	Sierra & Rhia FAM	Link	—	95	Entertainment	Canada	English
15	Zee Music Company	Link	Zee Entertainment Enterprises	88.5	Music	India	Hindi
16	KL BRO Biju Rithvik	Link	KLBro Biju	82.7	Vlogging	India	Malayalam
17	Colors TV	Link	Viacom18	81.9	Entertainment	India	Hindi
18	HAR PAL GEO	Link	Geo Entertainment	81.5	Entertainment	Pakistan	Urdu
19	ARY Digital HD	Link	ARY Digital Network	75.1	Entertainment	Pakistan	Urdu
20	El Reino Infantil	Link	Leader Music	73.3	Music	Argentina	Spanish
21	Movieclips	Link	Rotten Tomatoes Movieclips	69.6	Film	United States	English
22	Zack D. Films	Link	—	72.9	Entertainment	United States	English
23	Diary of 4	Link	—	68.4	People	Canada	English
24	Jasmin and James	Link	—	68.3	Entertainment	Australia	English
25	Cadel and Mia	Link	—	66	Entertainment	Australia	English
26	StarPlus	Link	Disney Star	66	Entertainment	India	Hindi
27	ISSEI / いっせい	Link	—	65.9	Entertainment	Japan	Japanese
28	The geeta gurjar	Link	—	63.6	People	India	Hindi
29	Ryan's World	Link	PocketWatch	63.4	Entertainment	United States	English
30	Dangal TV Channel	Link	Enterr10 Television Network	62.6	Entertainment	India	Bhojpuri
31	Super Simple Songs - Kids Songs	Link	—	62.1	Education	Canada	English
32	Alfredo Larin	Link	__	62	Entertainment	El Salvador	Spanish
33	Alan's Universe	Link	__	61.9	Comedy	United States	English
34	ChuChu TV Nursery Rhymes & Kids Songs	Link	ChuChu TV	59.4	Education	India	Hindi and English
35	ABS-CBN Entertainment	Link	ABS-CBN	59.1	Entertainment	Philippines	Filipino English
36	Vijay Television	Link	Star Vijay	58.8	Entertainment	India	Hindi
37	J House jr.	Link	—	58.4	Entertainment	United States	English
38	YRF	Link	Yash Raj Films	58.3	Music	India	Hindi
39	MaviGadget	Link	—	57.9	Technology	United States	English
40	Tips Official	Link	Tips Industries	56.2	Entertainment	India	Hindi
41	Pinkfong Baby Shark - Kids' Songs & Stories	Link	The Pinkfong Company	55.6	Education	South Korea	English
42	Celine Dept	Link	—	54.8	Entertainment	Belgium	English
43	D Billions	Link	—	54.3	Entertainment	Kyrgyzstan	English
44	Маша и Медведь	Link	LetsonCorp	54.1	Entertainment	Russia	Russian
45	El Payaso Plim Plim	Link	__	53.1	Music	Argentina	Spanish
46	HUM TV	Link	Hum Network	52.5	Entertainment	Pakistan	Urdu
47	News18 India	Link	—	51.8	News	India	Hindi
48	netd müzik	Link	netd.com	51.4	Music	Turkey	Turkish
49	LeoNata Family	Link	—	50.3	People	United States	English
50	Kritika Channel	Link	—	49.6	People	India	Hindi

== Historical progression ==
The first YouTube channel to exceed 10 billion total views was PewDiePie in September 2015. Since then, about 430 channels have exceeded 10 billion total views as of May 2024.

T-Series became the most-viewed YouTube channel of 2016, and exceeded 14 billion total views by January 2017. It eventually surpassed PewDiePie to become the most-viewed YouTube channel of all time by February 16, 2017, and currently maintains the lead with over 343 billion total views. T-Series has also had the most monthly views since 2016 until May 2025, and received more than 2.8 billion views per month as of May 2019.

The following table lists the channels that became YouTube's most-viewed channel at different points in time.

Current record for most days as most-viewed channel
Former record for most days as most-viewed channel

Channel name	Network / owner	Date achieved	Days held	Views	Reference	Country
T-Series	T-Series	February 16, 2017	3506	14.8 billion		India
PewDiePie	Felix Kjellberg	December 29, 2014	780	7.7 billion		Sweden
EMI Music	EMI Music Publishing	June 15, 2014	197	6.2 billion		United Kingdom
RihannaVEVO	Rihanna	March 22, 2014	85	4.4 billion		Barbados
Machinima	Machinima, Inc.	July 29, 2013	236	2.0 billion		United States
VEVO	Vevo	March 23, 2013	128	1.7 billion		United States
Universal Music Group	Universal Music Group	October 1, 2011	539	532 million		United States

Timeline of most-viewed YouTube channels (October 2011 – present)

== See also ==
- List of most-subscribed YouTube channels
- List of most-viewed YouTube videos
- List of most-liked YouTube videos
- List of most-disliked YouTube videos
- List of most-watched television broadcasts
