= List of most-disliked YouTube videos =

YouTube Rewind 2018 was the single most disliked video on YouTube, receiving 20 million dislikes since its upload on December 6, 2018, until it was deleted.

This list of most-disliked YouTube videos contains the top 42 videos with the most dislikes as of December 12, 2021, as derived from the American video platform, YouTube's, charts. The dislike count was taken directly from the page of the video itself. YouTube implemented like and dislike buttons on video pages as part of a major site redesign in 2010. The feature served as a replacement for the previous five-star rating system, which was found to be ineffective because of the rare selection of ratings from two to four stars. Of the 42 videos in this list, 6 also appear in the list of most-viewed YouTube videos and 4 appear in the list of most-liked YouTube videos. Note that the dislike count does not indicate the true unpopularity of a video, which is better represented by dislike percentage, also provided in the table below. For instance, "Despacito", "Baby Shark Dance" and "Gangnam Style" appear on this list, but also on the most-liked YouTube videos list. As of December 2021, Cocomelon has the most videos in the top 50 with thirteen, while YouTube and Jingle Toons have two.

YouTube Rewind 2018: Everyone Controls Rewind surpassed "Baby" to become the most-disliked YouTube video within a week of being uploaded.

On December 13, 2018, YouTube Rewind 2018: Everyone Controls Rewind became the most disliked video on the video-sharing platform, with 15 million dislikes, rapidly surpassing the music video for Justin Bieber's song "Baby", which had previously entered the Guinness World Records book as the most disliked video on YouTube and on the Internet. YouTube Rewind 2018 had over 7.1 million more dislikes than Justin Bieber's Baby on July 9, 2021.

In March 2011, "Baby", which then had 1.17 million dislikes, was surpassed by the video for Rebecca Black's "Friday", yielding more than 1.2 million dislikes. "Friday" amassed over three million dislikes before the video was taken down in June 2011. The video was reinstated three months later and has not been taken down since.

Measurement of dislikes on YouTube has been of academic and political interest. Following its immediate negative reception, Rick Perry's 2012 presidential campaign advertisement "Strong" garnered over 600,000 dislikes within five days. This phenomenon was seen by Mike Barthel of The Village Voice as a reason not to judge entertainment and politics by the same standard of online publicity; he opined that the only time people are going to care more about politics than entertainment is when there is a clear and immediate threat to their well-being.

Music videos, including children's music videos, made up a majority of the most disliked uploads to YouTube. "Baby Shark Dance" is the most-disliked children's music video, with over 14.39 million dislikes as of October 2021. 2016 showed the most-disliked videogame trailer, Call of Duty: Infinite Warfare, which stands at over three million dislikes. It became YouTube's second-most disliked video within two weeks of being released. In 2016, PewDiePie achieved a video in the top 3 by explicitly asking his own viewers to dislike his video.

Uploaded on the 12th of August, 2020, the trailer for Sadak 2 became the most disliked movie trailer on YouTube within the first two days after its release: on the 13th, it had already obtained 5.3 million dislikes. On the 18th, 6 days after its release, it surpassed Justin Bieber's "Baby" to become the second-most disliked video, with 13.24 million dislikes. As of October 2021, more than half of the top 50 most-disliked videos are music videos for children, with 31 of these 50 videos (62%) being set as "made for kids" according to YouTube's COPPA-compliant changes it made to its policy on January 6, 2020.

On November 10, 2021, YouTube made video dislike counts private to the creator, purportedly to "reduce harassment associated with targeted dislike attacks". The update was widely criticized by the YouTube community, including by many YouTubers and by co-founder and first uploader, Jawed Karim. One common point of criticism was that publicly visible dislikes enabled users to immediately spot and avoid videos that are fraudulent, unhelpful, dangerous, explicit, discriminatory, or generally low-quality, and now they can no longer count on that. However, there are some browser extensions (such as "Return YouTube Dislike" and "ImprovedTube") which allow the user to view estimated dislikes on videos. In the month following the change, on December 13, YouTube removed the actual dislike data from its API, making it fully inaccessible at last – both to users and to developers.

== Top videos ==
The following table lists the top 42 most disliked videos on YouTube, with the final visible dislike counts being rounded to the nearest thousand, as well as the creator, dislike percentage and upload date. As stated above, on December 13, 2021, YouTube fully removed public dislike data from all videos; (Note: Some videos may not be available worldwide due to YouTube regional restrictions in certain countries.) thus the number of dislikes shown below is data from the eve of the removal, the 12th, just before they were hidden.

Note: entries with a yellow background color indicate that the upload is not a music video.

Most disliked videos on YouTube from March 2010 to December 2021
Rank	Title	Uploader	Dislike count (millions)	Dislike percentage	Upload date	Category	Note	Country of origin
1	YouTube Rewind 2018: Everyone Controls Rewind	YouTube	20.358	86.63%	December 6, 2018	YouTube Rewind	(Note: YouTube Rewind 2018 became the most disliked video on YouTube in just 6 days and 10 hours, being the fastest video to break this record. Further being the first to break 10 million dislikes, and eventually the first and only video publicly known to break 20 million dislikes.)	United States
2	Baby Shark Dance	Pinkfong Kids' Songs & Stories	14.972	31.7%	June 17, 2016	Music video for children	(Note: "Baby Shark" became the fourth video to surpass 10 million dislikes on October 30, 2020. It is currently the most-viewed YouTube video with over 7 billion views as of November 2020. On April 8, 2021, it surpassed "Baby" to become the third most-disliked YouTube video. So far, it is only the fourth video to ever surpass "Baby" in dislikes, including the now-deleted original upload of "Friday," and the only video to do so while having a dislike ratio of less than 40%.)	South Korea
3	Sadak 2 | Official Trailer	Star Studios	13.667	94.86%	August 12, 2020	Movie trailer	(Note: "Sadak 2 Trailer" is the most-disliked movie trailer on YouTube within the first 24 hours of its upload, as well as the most-disliked Indian YouTube video as of August 2020. The video became the second most-disliked YouTube video within a week.)	India
4	Baby	Justin Bieber (featuring Ludacris)	12.476	38.26%	February 19, 2010	Music video	(Note: "Baby" was the most disliked video until "Friday" by Rebecca Black surpassed it in March 2011. "Friday" was deleted in June 2011, and "Baby" held the record for most disliked video until December 13, 2018, when it was passed by YouTube Rewind 2018. "Baby" became the first YouTube video to hit one million dislikes in late February 2011. Baby also became the first video to hit five million dislikes in late August 2015. "Baby" also held the title for the most-viewed YouTube video from July 16, 2010, until November 24, 2012.)	Canada
5	Johny Johny Yes Papa	LooLoo Kids	11.954	40.76%	October 8, 2016	Music video for children	(Note: On May 10, 2021, "Johny Johny Yes Papa" became the fifth YouTube video to surpass 10 million dislikes.)	Romania
6	YouTube Rewind 2019: For the Record	YouTube	9.587	73.3%	December 5, 2019	YouTube Rewind		United States
7	Bath Song	Cocomelon	8.941	41.87%	May 2, 2018	Music video for children		United States
8	Learning Colors – Colorful Eggs on a Farm	Мирошка ТВ (Myroshka TV)	8.436	39.78%	February 27, 2018	Educational video for children	(Note: Учим цвета Разноцветные яйца на ферме Развивающий мультик для детей is the most disliked YouTube video in a language other than English. The title means "Learn the colors- Colorful eggs on the farm". On January 24, 2021, it became the seventh video on YouTube to reach 7 million dislikes.)	Russia
9	Lakdi ki kathi	Jingle Toons	7.244	42.75%	June 14, 2018	Music video for children	(Note: When translated from Hindi into English, Lakdi ki kathi means "wooden saddle".)	India
10	Wheels on the Bus	Cocomelon	6.900	40.7%	May 24, 2018	Music video for children		United States
11	Humpty the train on a fruits ride	Kiddiestv Hindi	6.194	43.01%	January 26, 2018	Educational video for children		India
12	Old MacDonald Had a Farm – Kids nursery rhymes	Bounce Patrol – Kids Songs	6.153	43.33%	November 12, 2013	Music video for children		Australia
13	Keysha Play Filling Water in Balloons Daddy Finger Nursery Rhymes | Learn Colors With Balloons	Zuni and Family	5.773	41.32%	April 21, 2019	Educational video for children		Indonesia
14	Can this video get 1 million dislikes?	PewDiePie	5.720	93.72%	December 24, 2016	Comedy	(Note: This video reached 1 million and 2 million dislikes in the fastest time ever, doing so in 3.6 hours and 19 hours, respectively. It broke the previous records of 3 days and 11 days. This is also the most-disliked challenge video (challenging the viewer to dislike the video as much as possible))	Sweden
15	Flores	Vitão and Luísa Sonza	5.534	69.15%	June 11, 2020	Music video	(Note: "Flores" is the most-disliked Portuguese YouTube video as of July 2020.)	Brazil
16	Baa Baa Black Sheep	Cocomelon	5.528	43.12%	June 25, 2018	Music video for children		United States
17	It's Everyday Bro	Jake Paul featuring Team 10	5.462	63.56%	May 30, 2017	Music video		United States
18	Chal Chal Gurram	Infobells Telugu	5.425	44.19%	November 18, 2016	Music video for children		India
19	Despacito	Luis Fonsi featuring Daddy Yankee	5.216	9.97%	January 12, 2017	Music video	(Note: "Despacito" is the most-liked and second most-viewed YouTube video with over 50 million likes and 8 billion views as of November 2022.)	Puerto Rico
20	Dame Tu Cosita	El Chombo featuring Cutty Ranks	5.173	25.64%	April 5, 2018	Music video		Panama
21	Shake, shake your body! Clap, Clap, Cha Cha Cha!	D Billions	4.485	43.89%	January 12, 2020	Music video for children		Kyrgyzstan
22	Wheels on the Bus	Mother Goose Club Playhouse	4.442	45.2%	August 18, 2011	Music video for children		United States
23	"Masha and the Bear: Recipe for Disaster"	Get Movies	4.273	35.59%	January 31, 2012	Children's television series	(Note: Recipe for Disaster is the most viewed non-music video with over 4.5 billion views.)	Russia
24	Friday	Rebecca Black	4.078	74.56%	September 16, 2011	Music video		United States
25	Call of Duty: Infinite Warfare Reveal Trailer	Call of Duty	3.965	85.93%	May 2, 2016	Video game trailer	(Note: This video is the most-disliked video game trailer on YouTube. The video generated public outrage upon its release. Within its first 7 days on YouTube, the video garnered over 1.12 million dislikes. As of June 2021, it is the most-disliked age-restricted video on YouTube.)	United States
26	Yes Yes Vegetables Song	Cocomelon	3.946	39.62%	August 10, 2018	Music video for children		United States
27	Exploring Shillong | Shoot Diaries | Mr. Faisu	Faisal Shaikh	3.9	86.38%	May 14, 2020	Vlog		India
28	Twinkle Twinkle Little Star	Cocomelon	3.728	43.87%	December 6, 2017	Music video for children		United States
29	LA VACA LOLA canciones infantiles	toycantando	3.629	37.33%	April 12, 2016	Music video for children		Colombia
30	This Is The Way	Super Simple Songs	3.570	42.35%	June 8, 2016	Music video for children		Canada
31	Bath Song + More Nursery Rhymes & Kids Songs	Cocomelon	3.351	40.74%	June 4, 2018	Music video for children		United States
32	Baby Shark	Cocomelon	3.343	41.27%	November 21, 2017	Music video for children		United States
33	Yes Yes Vegetables Song + More Nursery Rhymes & Kids Songs – CoComelon	Cocomelon	3.340	40.13%	September 7, 2018	Music video for children		United States
34	How It Is (Wap Bap …)	BibisBeautyPalace	3.314	84.54%	May 5, 2017	Music video	(Note: This music video was uploaded by the German beauty YouTuber Bianca "Bibi" Heinicke. Fans and critics alike criticized the track for its shallow lyrics and poor vocal performance. Heinicke received some backlash prior to the song's release when the pre-order price of 4,99€ was revealed.)	Germany
35	Yummy Fruits & Vegetables | D Billions Kids Songs	D Billions	3.099	41.63%	September 16, 2020	Music video for children		Kyrgyzstan
36	Nani Teri Morni Ko Mor Le Gaye	Jingle Toons	3.088	39.66%	March 11, 2016	Music video for children		India
37	Beach Song + More Nursery Rhymes & Kids Songs	Cocomelon	3.070	39.66%	August 2, 2019	Music video for children		United States
38	Wheels on the Bus + More Nursery Rhymes & Kids Songs	Cocomelon	3.030	41.04%	June 28, 2018	Music video for children		United States
39	Gangnam Style	Psy	2.899	10.99%	July 15, 2012	Music video	(Note: "Gangnam Style" was the most-viewed video on YouTube from November 24, 2012, until July 10, 2017.)	South Korea
40	Upa Cavalinho	Galinha Pintadinha	2.871	32.76%	July 7, 2017	Music video for children		Brazil
41	No No Bedtime Song	Cocomelon	2.775	42.38%	July 12, 2017	Music video for children		United States
42	Yes Yes Playground Song	Cocomelon	2.564	41.36%	October 23, 2018	Music video for children		United States

== Historical most-disliked videos ==
The following table lists the last 4 videos known to have each historically become YouTube's most disliked video, from the implementation of the like–dislike system in March 2010 to the moment when the dislikes count was hidden from the public in December 2021. Of the 4 videos listed, the music video for Justin Bieber's Baby is the only one to have been the most disliked video twice – in August 21, 2010, and again in June 16 of the following year – and also the one that stayed at that top rank for the longest time (almost 90 months).

Record as of December 13, 2021
Former record
Video has since been removed from YouTube

Title	Uploader	Dislikes	Upload date	Date achieved	Days held	Reference(s)	Note
~YouTube Worst Video of All Time~ vote 1 star, leave comment	donotasyoudo	~195,000	October 3, 2007	March 31, 2010	~143		(Note: "~YouTube Worst Video of All Time~ vote 1 star, leave comment" was YouTube's first video to hold the No. 1 spot on this list. When the video was uploaded in 2007, YouTube still used the 5-star rating system. On March 31, 2010, when the rating system changed to likes and dislikes, all previous 1 star ratings were converted to dislikes and all 5 star ratings were converted to likes. This automatically made "~YouTube Worst Video of All Time~ vote 1 star, leave comment" YouTube's most disliked video at the time.)
Baby	Justin Bieber	~200,000	February 19, 2010	~August 21, 2010	~220		
Friday	trizzy66	1,200,000	February 10, 2011	March 29, 2011	79		(Note: "Friday" surpassed over 3.2 million dislikes before it was deleted in June 2011.)
Baby	Justin Bieber	1,450,000	February 19, 2010	June 16, 2011	2,737		
YouTube Rewind 2018: Everyone Controls Rewind	YouTube	9,882,000	December 6, 2018	December 13, 2018	1,096		(Note: "YouTube Rewind 2018" became the first video to hit 10 million dislikes, doing it within a week of its upload date.)
As of December 13, 2021

== See also ==
- List of most-liked YouTube videos
- List of most-viewed YouTube videos
- List of most-subscribed YouTube channels
