= List of most-viewed YouTube videos =

List of YouTube videos that have been viewed the most

YouTube is an American video-sharing service provider headquartered in San Bruno, California. The site indicates view counts of each uploaded video, making it possible to keep track of the most viewed, many of which continue to exist while others are no longer available on the site. Although the most-viewed were initially viral videos uploaded by amateur content creators, such as "Evolution of Dance" and "Charlie Bit My Finger", they have increasingly been music videos produced on behalf of professional recording artists. Since Lady Gaga's "Bad Romance" in April 2010, every video that has reached the top of the "most-viewed YouTube videos" list has been a music video.

In November 2005, a Nike advertisement featuring Brazilian football player Ronaldinho became the first video to reach 1,000,000 views. The billion-view mark was first passed by Gangnam Style in December 2012. On January 13, 2022, Pinkfong's "Baby Shark" became the first video to hit 10,000,000,000 views.

== Top videos ==
The following table lists the top 30 most-viewed long-form videos on YouTube, with each total rounded to the nearest 10 million views, uploader, and publication date. Note that some videos may not be available worldwide due to regional restrictions in certain countries.

Video name	Uploader	Views (billions)	Date	Genre	Notes
Baby Shark Dance	Pinkfong Baby Shark - Kids' Songs & Stories	17.28	June 17, 2016	Children's song	(Note: "Baby Shark Dance" was the fifth video to reach 4 billion views on November 25, 2019, the second video to reach: 5 billion views on April 3, 2020; 6 billion views on July 16, 2020; 7 billion views on October 29, 2020; and the first to reach: 8 billion views on February 23, 2021; 9 billion views on July 20, 2021; 10 billion views on January 13, 2022; 11 billion views on July 24, 2022; 12 billion views on December 29, 2022; 13 billion views on June 20, 2023; 14 billion views on January 26, 2024; 15 billion views on September 1, 2024.; 16 billion views on June 19, 2025; 17 billion views on June 9, 2026; 17,179,869,184 views (2^{34}) on August 2, 2026; It surpassed "Despacito" on November 1, 2020 to become the most-viewed video of all time.)
Wheels on the Bus	Cocomelon - Nursery Rhymes	9.34	May 24, 2018	Children's song	(Note: "Wheels on the Bus" surpassed "Despacito" on June 27 or June 28, 2026, to become the second most viewed video.)
Despacito	Luis Fonsi	9.11	January 12, 2017	Music video	(Note: "Despacito" surpassed "See You Again" as the most viewed video on August 4, 2017. It was the first video to reach: 3 billion views on August 4, 2017; 4 billion views on October 11, 2017; 5 billion views on April 5, 2018; 6 billion views on February 24, 2019; 7 billion views on October 10, 2020; and the second video to reach 8 billion views on November 6, 2022. It is YouTube's second most liked video with over 55 million likes as of February 2026.)
009 1225 GetInspiredOnGroups Crafts GLOBAL Acq EN UAC 1920x1080 21s Null FB M0 267	Facebook	8.02	September 8, 2022	Advertisement	(Note: The most viewed known advertisement on YouTube, and most-viewed non-music video. It is also the most viewed unlisted video on YouTube. On August 30, 2026, it became the fourth YouTube video to reach 8 billion views, and the fastest one to ever do so, at just 2 years and 11 months.)
Bath Song	Cocomelon - Nursery Rhymes	7.61	May 2, 2018	Children's song	
Johny Johny Yes Papa	LooLoo Kids - Nursery Rhymes and Children's Songs	7.24	October 8, 2016	Children's song	
Phonics Song with Two Words	ChuChu TV Nursery Rhymes & Kids Songs	7.08	March 6, 2014	Children's song	(Note: The ratings for the "Phonics Song" are disabled by its uploader, and this is the highest-viewed video with this setting. Uploaders can manually decide to hide or unhide the number of likes by checking or unchecking the "Show how many viewers like this video" on the "Video details" page.)
See You Again	Wiz Khalifa	7.08	April 6, 2015	Music video	(Note: "See You Again" surpassed "Gangnam Style" as the most viewed video on July 10, 2017. It was the second video to reach 2 billion views on September 3, 2016 and 3 billion views on August 6, 2017; the third to reach 4 billion views on February 7, 2019; and the fourth to reach 5 billion views on March 7, 2021. It is the fourth most liked video with over 46 million likes as of February 2026.)
Shape of You	Ed Sheeran	6.79	January 30, 2017	Music video	(Note: "Shape of You" was the second video to reach 4 billion views on January 7, 2019; the third to reach 5 billion views on October 1, 2020; and the fifth to reach 6 billion views on May 23, 2023.)
Axel F	Crazy Frog	6.14	June 16, 2009	Music video	
Gangnam Style	Psy	6.05	July 15, 2012	Music video	(Note: "Gangnam Style" surpassed "Baby" as the most viewed video on November 24, 2012. It was the first video to reach 1 billion views on December 21, 2012, and 2 billion views on May 30, 2014; the third to reach 3 billion views on November 25, 2017; and the eighth to reach 4 billion views on March 4, 2021.)
Uptown Funk	Mark Ronson	5.89	November 19, 2014	Music video	
Shree Hanuman Chalisa	T-Series Bhakti Sagar	5.67	May 10, 2011	Devotional song	
Dame Tu Cosita	Ultra Records	5.60	April 5, 2018	Music video	
Learning Colors – Colorful Eggs on a Farm	Miroshka TV	5.51	February 27, 2018	Children's educational	
Baa Baa Black Sheep	Cocomelon - Nursery Rhymes	4.92	June 25, 2018	Children's song	
Temu's Big Game Ad	Temu	4.74	February 12, 2024	Advertisement	
Waka Waka (This Time for Africa)	Shakira	4.73	June 4, 2010	Music video	
Masha and the Bear – Recipe for Disaster	Get Movies	4.67	January 31, 2012	Animated children's	
Lakdi Ki Kathi	Jingle Toons	4.65	June 14, 2018	Children's song	
Humpty the train on a fruits ride	Kiddiestv Hindi - Nursery Rhymes & Kids Songs	4.41	January 26, 2018	Children's song	
Counting Stars	OneRepublic	4.40	May 31, 2013	Music video	
Sugar	Maroon 5	4.37	January 14, 2015	Music video	
Baby Shark	Cocomelon - Nursery Rhymes	4.39	November 21, 2017	Children's song	
Roar	Katy Perry	4.30	September 5, 2013	Music video	
Dark Horse	Katy Perry	4.15	February 20, 2014	Music video	
Perfect	Ed Sheeran	4.14	November 9, 2017	Music video	
Sorry	Justin Bieber	4.09	October 22, 2015	Music video	
Let Her Go	Passenger	4.04	July 25, 2012	Music video	
Girls Like You	Maroon 5	4.00	May 31, 2018	Music video	
As of August 30, 2026 (Video #4 added on August 23, 2026)

== Billion-View Club ==
An early metric of a video's popularity was the so-called Billion-View Club, denoting videos which had succeeded in reaching over 1 billion views since their initial upload.

In December 2012, "Gangnam Style" became the first video to reach one billion views. By June 2015, only this video and "Baby" had managed to pass this threshold, but, by October 2015, a total of ten videos had done so, and the number grew further to over 400 in 2024.

Older videos that pre-date the launch of YouTube in 2005, but were uploaded later and pass a billion views, are as follows:

- "November Rain" by Guns N' Roses became the first video made prior to 2005, YouTube's foundation year, to reach this threshold by July 2018.
- "Numb" by Linkin Park was the first 2000s video predating YouTube to reach 1 billion views in November 2018.
- "Bohemian Rhapsody" by Queen was the first 1970s video (and pre-1990s video) to reach 1 billion views in July 2019.
- "Sweet Child o' Mine" by Guns N' Roses was the first 1980s video to reach 1 billion views in October 2019.
- "Zombie" by The Cranberries was the first female sung pre-2005 video to reach 1 billion views in April 2020.
- The music video for "La Isla Bonita," filmed on March 14, 1987, became Madonna’s first video to surpass one billion views on YouTube in April 2025.

With numerous videos readily clearing one billion views by 2018, more interest has been on two- and three-billion-views-and-higher metrics. In May 2014, "Gangnam Style" became the first video to exceed two billion views. "Despacito" became the first video to reach three billion views in August 2017, four billion in October 2017, five billion in April 2018, six billion in February 2019, and seven billion in October 2020. "Baby Shark Dance" became the first video to reach eight billion views in February 2021, nine billion views in July 2021, and ten billion views in January 2022. As of June 2026, it has more than seventeen billion views.

As of April 2026, 30 videos have exceeded four billion views, fourteen of which exceed five billion views, eight of which exceed six billion views, five of which exceed seven billion views, and three of which exceed eight billion views. "See You Again" became the second video to reach three billion views in August 2017, followed by "Gangnam Style" in November 2017. "Shape of You" became the second video to reach four billion views in January 2019, followed by "See You Again" in February 2019. "Baby Shark Dance" became the second video to reach five billion views in April 2020, followed by "Shape of You" in October 2020. "Baby Shark Dance" became the second video to reach six billion views in July 2020, and seven billion views in October 2020.

The majority of these videos in the Billion-View Club have been commercial music videos by popular artists, but the list has included oddities, typically programs aimed at children. Such videos include two episodes of the Russian animated cartoon Masha and the Bear, a version of "The Wheels on the Bus" by the British animation studio Little Baby Bum, and "Johnny Johnny Yes Papa" from children's stations LooLoo Kids and ChuChu TV. Additionally, an advertisement for Facebook has 8 billion views, titled "009 1225 GetInspiredOnGroups Crafts GLOBAL Acq EN UAC 1920x1080 21s Null FB M0 267", being the most viewed advertisement and non-music video on the platform, although it technically only has instrumental music in it and no other audio. Various versions of the song "Baby Shark" in total amassed more than five billion views by January 2019, with the original version posted by Pinkfong having exceeded two billion views previously. The original "Baby Shark" video by Pinkfong is now the most viewed video on the site. On October 29, 2020, Baby Shark surpassed 7 billion views, and on November 2, 2020, it passed Despacito to become the most viewed video on YouTube. On February 23, 2021, Baby Shark surpassed 8 billion views, becoming the first video to do so. On July 20, 2021, Baby Shark surpassed 9 billion views, becoming the first video to do so. On January 13, 2022, Baby Shark became the first (and currently only) video to surpass 10 billion views.

On July 14, 2022, YouTube made a special playlist and video celebrating the 317 music videos to have hit 1 billion views and joined the "Billion Views Club".

On April 1, 2024, the communications app Discord incorporated a short trailer video into their in-app April Fools' Day prank regarding loot boxes. The video automatically looped for anyone with Discord open, even if the notification had not been opened yet. This had the inadvertent effect of massively increasing the trailer's view count, causing it to reach a billion views in less than 24 hours and becoming the most-viewed video in that timeframe on the platform, surpassing Grand Theft Auto VI's trailer which gained over 90 million views in a single day. The video later had its view count adjusted to the low millions.

In June 2026, the Hindi-dubbed version of the Indian film Jaya Janaki Nayaka surpassed 1 billion views on YouTube, becoming the first full-length feature film in the world to reach the milestone on the platform.

== Historical most-viewed videos ==
The following table lists the videos that became YouTube's most-viewed video, from October 2005 to the present.

Current record of days held (⁂)
Former record of days held (*)
Indicates the video has since been removed from YouTube or set to private (‡)

Progression of the most-viewed video on YouTube
Video name	Uploader	Views at achievement*	Publication date	Date achieved	Days after upload	Days held	Genre	Takedown date	Ref	Notes
"Baby Shark Dance"⁂	Pinkfong Baby Shark - Kids' Songs & Stories	7,046,700,000	June 17, 2016	November 2, 2020	1600	2,204	Children's song			
"Despacito"	Luis Fonsi	2,993,700,000	January 12, 2017	August 4, 2017	206	1,186	Music video			
"See You Again"	Wiz Khalifa	2,894,000,000	April 6, 2015	July 10, 2017	826	25	Music video			
"Gangnam Style"*	Psy	803,700,000	July 15, 2012	November 24, 2012	134	1,689	Music video			
"Baby"*	Justin Bieber	245,400,000	February 19, 2010	July 15, 2010	148	863	Music video			(Note: "Baby" became to first video to reach 500 million views on March 28, 2011.)
"Bad Romance"	Lady Gaga	178,400,000	November 24, 2009	April 14, 2010	143	92	Music video			(Note: "Bad Romance" became the first video to reach 200 million views on May 9, 2010.)
"Charlie Bit My Finger"	HDCYT	128,900,000	May 22, 2007	October 25, 2009	887	171	Comedy / viral	July 2021 (made available again January 2024)		
"Evolution of Dance" (3rd time as most viewed video)	Judson Laipply	118,900,000	April 6, 2006	May 2, 2009	1062	176	Comedy / viral			
"Girlfriend"‡	RCA Records	92,600,000	February 27, 2007	July 17, 2008	508	289	Music video	November 2009		(Note: Approximately ten million views per month as of 2007.)
"Evolution of Dance" (2nd time as most viewed video)	Judson Laipply	78,400,000	April 6, 2006	March 15, 2008	651	124	Comedy / viral			
"Music Is My Hot Hot Sex"‡	CLARUSBARTEL72	76,600,000	April 9, 2007	March 1, 2008	327	14	Music video	March 15, 2008		(Note: "Music is My Hot Hot Sex" became the first video to reach 100 million views on March 11, 2008. The uploader then deleted the video four days later, and "Evolution of Dance" regained its status as the most-viewed video.)
"Evolution of Dance"*	Judson Laipply	10,600,000	April 6, 2006	May 19, 2006	43	652	Comedy / viral			(Note: "Evolution of Dance" became the first video to reach 20 million views on June 5, 2006 and the first video to reach 50 million views on June 7, 2007, and received approximately five million views per month. It is the only video on this list to hold the No. 1 spot on more than one occasion.)
"Dancing in the Dark"‡	Cosmotastic	5,500,000	November 25, 2005	Mar 23, 2006	118	52	Comedy / viral	May 2006		
"Pokemon Theme Music Video"‡	Smosh	4,300,000	November 28, 2005	March 12, 2006	105	11	Comedy / viral	June 2007		(Note: "Pokémon Theme Music Video" became the first video to reach 10 million views on May 6, 2006. It was removed from YouTube in June 2007 for copyright infringement.)
"Myspace – The Movie"‡	eggtea	2,700,000	January 31, 2006	February 18, 2006	18	22	Comedy / viral	mid-2006		
"Jay Leno Phony Photo Booth"‡	mugenized	3,400,000	December 6, 2005	January 21, 2006	50	28	Comedy / viral	February 14 to 18, 2006		(Note: "Phony Photo Booth" became the first video to reach 5 million views on February 8, 2006. It was removed from YouTube in February 14–18, 2006 for terms of use violation.)
"The Chronic of Narnia Rap"‡	youtubedude	2,300,000	December 18, 2005	January 9, 2006	22	12	Comedy / viral	February 14 to 17, 2006		
"Ronaldinho: Touch of Gold"‡*	Nikesoccer	255,000	October 21, 2005	October 31, 2005	10	70	Sports / advertisement	July to August 2009		(Note: "Ronaldinho: Touch of Gold" became the first video to reach 500,000 views on November 3, 2005; first video to reach 2 million views on December 12, 2005. It was removed from YouTube in July–August 2009 for copyright infringement.)
"I/O Brush"‡*	larfus	247,000	October 5, 2005	October 27, 2005	24	4	Technology demo	January to April 2007		
"tow chinese boys:i want it that way"‡	cow	142,000	June 26, 2005	August 28, 2005	63	60	Comedy / viral	March to October 2021		
"Money, get a way!"‡	DekKu	27,400	July 16, 2005	July 21, 2005	5	38	Comedy / viral	June 2006		
"Under the Bridge!"‡	jawed	700	June 11, 2005	June 14, 2005	3	37	Comedy / viral	February - June 2006		
As of November 15, 2026

* The approximate number of views each video had when it became YouTube's most-viewed video.

== Other milestones ==
YouTube announced that cumulative views of videos related to Minecraft, some of which had been on the platform as early as 2009, exceeded 1 trillion views on December 14, 2021, and was the most-watched video game content on the site.

== See also ==
- List of most-disliked YouTube videos
- List of most-liked YouTube videos
- List of most-subscribed YouTube channels
- List of most-viewed YouTube channels
- List of viral music videos
- List of Spotify streaming records
