= List of most-liked YouTube videos =

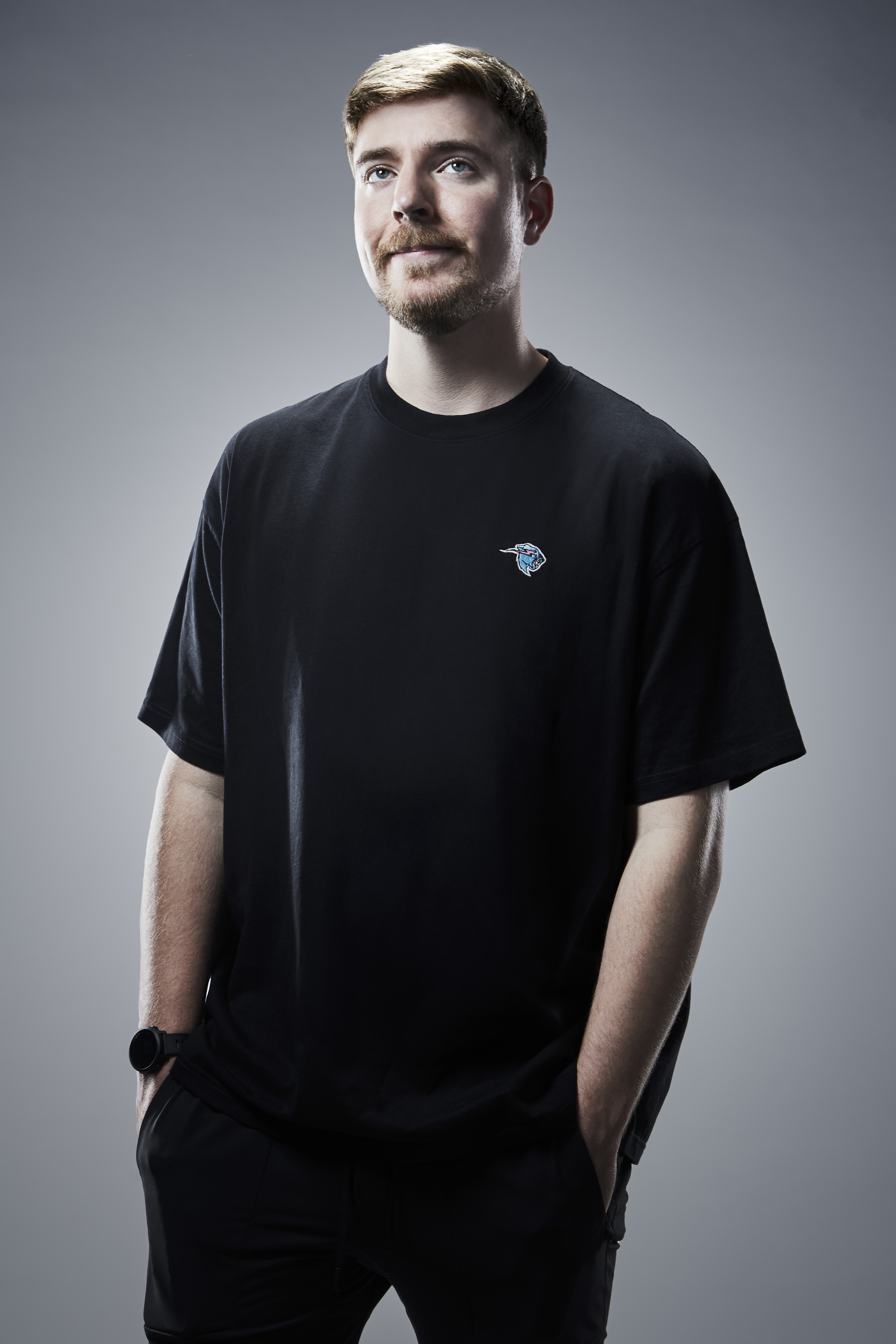
MrBeast, creator of the "Would You Fly to Paris for a Baguette?" short which has been the most-liked video on YouTube since January 2025, with over 58 million likes as of August 2026.

This list of most-liked YouTube videos contains the top 30 videos with the most likes of all time, taken directly from the video page. The American video platform YouTube implemented a like and dislike button on these pages in March 2010, part of a major redesign of the site. This served as a replacement for their five-star rating system; YouTube's designers found the previous system ineffective because the options to rate a video between two and four stars were rarely selected.

The music video for LMFAO's song "Party Rock Anthem" stood as the most-liked video on YouTube in 2012, with 1.56 million likes, until the video for Psy's "Gangnam Style" surpassed it in September that year with more than 1.57 million likes. Following this accomplishment, "Gangnam Style" entered the Guinness World Records book as the most-liked video on YouTube and on the Internet as of 2012. Psy's video remained the most-liked on YouTube for nearly four years until August 27, 2016, when Wiz Khalifa's "See You Again" featuring Charlie Puth surpassed it with 11.21 million likes. Less than a year later, on July 25, 2017, Luis Fonsi's "Despacito" music video featuring Daddy Yankee claimed the top spot with 16.01 million likes. Despacito became the first YouTube video to reach 50 million likes on October 23, 2022. "Despacito" remained the most-liked video for over seven years until January 27, 2025, when MrBeast's "Would You Fly to Paris for a Baguette?" video surpassed it with 55 million likes. It is also the most-liked video uploaded under the YouTube Shorts banner.

The most liked non-music and non-short video is also held by MrBeast, with his video called "Make This Video The Most Liked Video On Youtube" which has over 30 million likes as of August 2026. He has held this record since May 2019, after surpassing PewDiePie's most liked non-music video.

== Top videos ==
The following table lists the top 30 most-liked videos on YouTube, with each total rounded to the nearest ten thousand likes, uploader, and upload date. (Note: Some videos may not be available worldwide due to YouTube's regional restrictions in certain countries.)

Entries with a yellow background color indicate that the upload is a music video.
Entries with a blue background color indicate that the upload is a short-form video.
Entries with a pink background color indicates that the video has been removed from YouTube or set to private.

Most-liked videos
No.	Video name	Uploader / artist	Likes (millions)	Upload date	Notes	Country/territory
1.	"Would You Fly to Paris for a Baguette?"	MrBeast	58.70	December 9, 2022	(Note: "Would You Fly to Paris for a Baguette?" surpassed "Despacito" as the most-liked video on January 27, 2025.)	United States
2.	"Despacito"	Luis Fonsi featuring Daddy Yankee	56.62	January 12, 2017	(Note: "Despacito" surpassed "See You Again" as the most-liked video on July 25, 2017; first video to reach 20 million likes on August 30, 2017; first video to reach 30 million likes on September 29, 2018; first video to reach 40 million likes on September 24, 2020; and the first video to reach 50 million likes on October 23, 2022.)	Puerto Rico
3.	"See You Again"	Wiz Khalifa featuring Charlie Puth	46.94	April 6, 2015	(Note: "See You Again" surpassed "Gangnam Style" as the most-liked video on August 27, 2016; second video to reach 30 million likes on September 12, 2020.)	United States
4.	"Baby Shark Dance"	Baby Shark - Pinkfong Kids’ Songs & Stories	46.92	June 17, 2016	(Note: "Baby Shark Dance" is the fifth video to reach 20 million likes on August 31, 2020; fourth video to reach 30 million likes on August 21, 2021; third video to reach 40 million likes on April 19, 2023.)	South Korea
5.	"Our MOST INTENSE Balloon Popping Race"	How Ridiculous	43.09	April 19, 2022		Australia
6.	"Giving iPhones Instead Of Candy on Halloween"	MrBeast	42.93	November 2, 2022		United States
7.	"One Two Three"	NuNu Tv Nursery Rhymes	40.12	December 6, 2023		United States
8.	"Dynamite"	BTS	39.72	August 21, 2020	(Note: "Dynamite" is the sixth and fastest video to reach 20 million likes, doing so on October 23, 2020, two months after release; third and fastest video to reach 30 million likes on August 11, 2021, less than a year after release.)	South Korea
9.	"If Cleaning Was a Timed Sport. Part 2"	Daniel LaBelle	38.81	October 18, 2022		United States
10.	"Katana Vs Bullet"	MrBeast	38.56	September 7, 2023		United States
11.	"The Rock Vs MrBeast For $100,000"	MrBeast	36.46	October 21, 2022		United States
12.	"Shape of You"	Ed Sheeran	35.84	January 30, 2017	(Note: "Shape of You" is the third video to reach 20 million likes on June 12, 2019.)	United Kingdom
13.	"OMG Best Teacher"	Dednahype	34.43	December 21, 2021		Latvia
14.	"ToRung Comedy: Magic Box"	ToRung	33.57	October 10, 2024	(Note: "ToRung Comedy: Magic Box" became the first Vietnamese video to reach 30 million likes in mid-2025, however it has since been privatized.)	Vietnam
15.	"Rating Strangers Shots (Crazy Fail Compilation)"	Tuvok	33.07	March 11, 2023		France
16.	"Revenge"	Lucas and Marcus	32.87	July 26, 2022		United States
17.	"Home Alone in a Rush"	Daniel LaBelle	32.66	December 7, 2021		United States
18.	"Real Life Transforming Cinderella Dress"	Justinflom	32.37	November 8, 2022		United States
19.	"Gangnam Style"	Psy	32.16	July 15, 2012	(Note: "Gangnam Style" surpassed "Party Rock Anthem" as the most-liked video on September 13, 2012; first video to reach 10 million likes on November 3, 2015; seventh video to reach 20 million likes on December 7, 2020.)	South Korea
20.	"Imitoys - If you can't imitate, just stay home!"	Monica Toy	31.73	November 8, 2022		Brazil
21.	"I drew Khaby Lame and Bella Poarch and gave it to them (crazy reaction!)"	Devon Rodriguez	31.37	August 15, 2023		United States
22.	"Gordon Ramsay Tries Most Expensive Chocolate Bar"	MrBeast	31.28	November 19, 2022		United States
23.	"I NEED 1 MORE SUBSCRIBER"	MrBeast	31.15	October 5, 2023		United States
24.	"Tipping A Waitress A Car"	MrBeast	31.02	April 22, 2023		United States
25.	"Power Tools Racing is INTENSE"	How Ridiculous	30.79	April 12, 2022		Australia
26.	"The Boys - Self Defence Comedy"	Adhemz & Detroit Threat Management Center	30.77	September 16, 2022		New Zealand
27.	"I Sent a Subscriber to Disneyland"	MrBeast	30.55	March 30, 2023		United States
28.	"Faded"	Alan Walker	30.39	December 3, 2015	(Note: "Faded" is the fourth video to reach 20 million likes on July 3, 2020.)	Norway
29.	"How Zach King Gets Away With Doing Graffiti"	dollarbill (re-uploader), Zach King (creator)	30.35	July 23, 2019	(Note: "How Zach King Gets Away With Doing Graffiti" is the fourteenth video to reach 20 million likes on October 24, 2021.) (Note: This video was uploaded before YouTube Shorts was officially launched. Once YouTube started to automatically consider vertical videos under one minute as Shorts, this video, by default and on a technicality, became the most viewed video on Shorts.)	United States
30.	"$100,000,000 Car Doors"	MrBeast	30.23	September 19, 2023		United States
As of August 30, 2026

== Historical most-liked videos ==
The following table lists the videos that became YouTube's most-liked video, from the implementation of the like button in March 2010 to the present. The music video for LMFAO's "Party Rock Anthem" is the only video to have been the most liked video twice.

Current record of days held (⁂)
Former record of days held (*)
Indicates a non-music video.

Video name	Uploader	Likes (Note: The approximate number of likes each video had when it became YouTube's most-liked video.)	Upload date	Date achieved	Days held	Ref	Notes
"Would You Fly to Paris for a Baguette?"	MrBeast	54,389,000	December 9, 2022	January 27, 2025	648^{†}		
"Despacito"⁂	Luis Fonsi	16,010,000	January 12, 2017	July 25, 2017	2,740		(Note: "Despacito" became the first video to reach 20 million likes on August 30, 2017; first video to reach 30 million likes on September 29, 2018; first video to reach 40 million likes on September 24, 2020; and the first video to reach 50 million likes on October 23, 2022.)
"See You Again"	Wiz Khalifa	11,210,000	April 6, 2015	August 27, 2016	332		
"Gangnam Style"*	Psy	1,570,000	July 15, 2012	September 13, 2012	1,444		(Note: "Gangnam Style" became the first video to reach 2 million likes on September 18, 2012, 5 million likes on November 11, 2012, and 10 million likes on November 3, 2015.)
"Party Rock Anthem" (2)	LMFAO	1,390,000	March 8, 2011	April 4, 2012	162		
"Kony 2012"	Invisible Children	1,350,000	March 5, 2012	March 17, 2012	18		(Note: "Kony 2012" was a viral campaign by Invisible Children that aimed to raise support for Joseph Kony's arrest. In 12 days it became YouTube's most-liked video, only to be surpassed by "Party Rock Anthem" 18 days later.)
"Party Rock Anthem"	LMFAO	950,000	March 8, 2011	November 3, 2011	135		(Note: "Party Rock Anthem" was the first video to reach 1 million likes on November 15, 2011. It is the only video on this list to hold the No. 1 spot on more than one occasion.)
"Baby"	Justin Bieber	760,000	February 19, 2010	July 6, 2011	120		
"Evolution of Dance"*	Judson Laipply	620,000	April 6, 2006	March 31, 2010	462		(Note: "Evolution of Dance" was YouTube's first video to hold the No. 1 spot on this list. When the video was uploaded in 2006, YouTube still used the 5-star rating system. On March 31, 2010, when the rating system changed to likes and dislikes, all previous 1 star ratings were converted to dislikes and all 5 star ratings were converted to likes. This automatically made "Evolution of Dance" YouTube's most-liked video at the time.)
^{†}As of November 6, 2026

Timeline of most-liked videos (Mar 2010 – Aug 2026)

== See also ==
- List of most-disliked YouTube videos
- List of most-viewed YouTube videos
- List of most-subscribed YouTube channels
- List of most-viewed YouTube channels
