= YouTube (YouTube channel) =

Official channel of YouTube

- YouTube's channel logo
- Other name: YouTube Spotlight

YouTube information
- Channel: YouTube
- Years active: 2005–present
- Subscribers: 46.6 million
- Views: 1.3 billion
- Last updated: October 30, 2026
- Website: youtube.com

YouTube, formerly named YouTube Spotlight, is the official YouTube channel for the American video-sharing platform of the same name, spotlighting videos and events on the platform. Events shown on the channel include YouTube Comedy Week and the YouTube Music Awards. Additionally, the channel uploaded annual installments of YouTube Rewind between 2010 and 2019. The channel briefly ranked as the most-subscribed on the platform in late 2013. As of October 2026, the channel has 46.6 million subscribers and 1.3 billion video views.

== History ==
On November 2, 2013, the YouTube channel briefly surpassed PewDiePie's channel, to become the most-subscribed channel on the website. The channel ascended to the top position through auto-suggesting and pre-selecting itself as a subscription option upon new user registration for YouTube.

== Videos ==
=== YouTube Rewind ===
Between 2010 and 2019, YouTube released an annual YouTube Rewind video through its Spotlight channel. The series' 2016 installment, The Ultimate 2016 Challenge, became YouTube's fastest video to reach 100 million views, doing so in just over three days. It is also the eighth-most-liked non-music video of all time with over 3.40 million likes. Shortly after the video was released, the Spotlight channel surpassed 1 billion total video views.

The 2018 installment, Everyone Controls Rewind, was received overwhelmingly negatively. In just under a week after its release, it became YouTube's most-disliked video of all time, surpassing the music video for Justin Bieber's "Baby", and shortly thereafter became the first YouTube video to reach 10 million dislikes.

The following year, YouTube Rewind 2019: For the Record also quickly garnered a notably negative like–dislike ratio as well, amassing 3.9 million dislikes within its first day of release. It is currently the third-most-disliked YouTube video with over 9.6 million dislikes.

=== YouTube Nation ===
In January 2014, YouTube Nation was launched on its channel, as a collaborative project between YouTube and DreamWorks Animation. DWA oversaw the production while YouTube managed the sales and marketing of the series. The series is a news series that rounds up information from the Spotlight channel. YouTube also promotes the series through its Spotlight channel. Early in its history, the series used guest hosts Grace Helbig, Hannah Hart, and Mamrie Hart (no relation) to help propel the series and its audience.

Due to regularly being promoted on the Spotlight channel (now just called YouTube), YouTube Nation was able to reach the 1 million subscriber milestone within three months of its launch. The series was nominated for the fourth annual Streamy Award under Best News and Current Events but lost to SourceFed. After 350 episodes, the series aired its last episode on December 5, 2014.

=== Hello 2021 ===
On December 10, 2020, YouTube announced that Fremantle would produce Hello 2021—a series of five localized New Year's Eve countdown specials that will celebrate notable videos of the year, and feature other guest appearances and performances. There will be separate specials for Japan, South Korea, India, the UK, and the Americas.

=== One Trillion Minecraft Views on YouTube and Counting ===
In December 2021, One Trillion Minecraft Views on YouTube and Counting was posted to commemorate the one trillion views of Minecraft-related videos. Featuring various Minecraft content creators, the video is a 3D animation based on the game.

== Events ==
=== Themed week events ===
In May 2013, the Spotlight channel was being used to stream its Comedy Week event, produced by ChannelFlip. During the event, YouTube used its homepage to spotlight comedy videos made specifically for the event. The video of the 2-hour kickoff event has earned 1.06 million views as of September 2014. The event was met with mixed critical reception, with the particular mixture of new and traditional media personalities, as well as technical difficulties being specifically scrutinized. The event was the first of its kind about being streamed by YouTube. Although it was marketed as the first annual Comedy Week event, there have been no announcements regarding a follow-up Comedy Week event.

On August 4, 2013, YouTube launched "Geek Week", which was kicked off by Freddie Wong in the United States, and TomSka in the United Kingdom. The week was composed of themed days, which included Blockbuster Sunday, Global Geekery Monday, Brainiac Tuesday, Super Wednesday, Gaming Thursday, and Fan Friday. The event was launched in conjunction with Nerdist in the US, and ChannelFlip in the UK.

=== #ProudToLove ===
During the 2013 LGBT Pride Month, the channel was used to bring light to LGBT and LGBT pride-related information and videos. Google, which owns YouTube, has been said by TechCrunch to be "a huge proponent of gay rights". An article on the Official YouTube Blog was attached to the event.

=== YouTube Music Awards ===
In November 2013, YouTube launched its first YT Music Awards presentation. Announcing its nominations in the previous month, the award show aimed to create traffic through its social media voting format. The event was streamed onto the Spotlight channel, and has earned over 4.5 million views as of September 2014. The event's technical difficulties and its plethora of nominations for mainstream artists, rather than YouTube artists, were at the center of overall mixed critical reception.

Achievements
Preceded by PewDiePie	Most Subscribed Channel on YouTube; 2013-2013	Succeeded by PewDiePie
Preceded by PewDiePie	Most Subscribed Channel on YouTube; 2013-2013	Succeeded by PewDiePie
