= Johnny Johnny Yes Papa =

Nursery rhyme

"Johnny Johnny Yes Papa" is an English-language children's poem. The song is about a child, Johnny, who is caught by his father for eating sugar when he is not supposed to. Versions of this song comprising more than one verse usually continue with variations on this theme.

== History ==
A 1989 book by the American scholar and professor Francelia Butler records the poem being told in Kenya in 1980. According to Vinoth Chandar, the CEO of ChuChu TV, it was already old enough to have been in the public domain in India by 2018, indicating that it would have been at least 60 years old (per Indian copyright law); Chandar wrote in 2018 that he "used to hear it" as a child, and that elderly people would also have listened to it as children.

== Lyrics ==
The lyrics to the song are in a call and response format, and typically sung to the tune of "Twinkle, Twinkle, Little Star". The original and most well-known version of the song is:

Johnny, Johnny.
Yes, Papa.
Eating sugar?
No, Papa.
Telling lies?
No, Papa.
Open your mouth
Ha-ha-ha!

== YouTube videos ==
Johnny Johnny Yes Papa has been featured on YouTube since at least 2007, where it was used in an Indian commercial for the 5 Star chocolate brand. It later appeared as a nursery rhyme in 2009 by the channel Shemrock Nursery Rhymes. The nursery rhyme has since been recreated by many other edutainment YouTube channels targeting young children. A parody of the nursery rhyme was uploaded by the user EdukayFUN on October 9, 2014. It uses intentionally uncanny CGI animation and ends with Johnny being eaten by his father. The channel was terminated in 2018, but still uploads videos as EdukayFUN 2.0. The original parody video was reuploaded in June 2020 in 4K HD.

The song became an internet meme in August 2018, with one version by the Indian channel Billion Surprise Toys—a company with 56.6 million subscribers to its YouTube channel— going particularly viral on Twitter. This version prominently features Johny and his father doing popular dance moves such as the "Gangnam Style" dance, and intertwines the original lyrics with a repeated "doo-doo-doo-da-doo" to the melody of "Baby Shark".

Shortly after the song went viral, Billion Surprise Toys began to issue aggressive DMCA takedown requests for videos and images derived from its own videos published on social media. This move was considered controversial for various reasons. Firstly, because of the unclear copyright status of the song itself, secondly because American copyright law permits parodies as a form of fair use, and thirdly, because the UAE (Billion Surprise Toys' native country) allows for "The reproduction of the work for the purpose of personal, non-profit and non-professional use" under their fair use laws.

== Reception ==
The various videos by edutainment channels on YouTube were subsequently described as "terrifying", "disturbing", "nonsensical" and "a godforsaken nightmare". The song's popularity has been attributed to the Elsagate phenomenon of potentially disturbing or absurd YouTube videos being algorithmically shown to children through the YouTube website and the YouTube Kids app. The Verge, Mashable and New York Magazine found "remixes" by Billion Surprise Toys, one featuring an anthropomorphic refrigerator (as the liar), to be particularly absurd, even when compared to other "Johny Johny Yes Papa" videos. The Verge went on further to explain that "Each video features a child and their family lying to one another as a form of affection." The song has also been mentioned by The Daily Dot as one of eleven "unintentionally disturbing" YouTube videos for children.
