= Issei (internet personality) =

Japanese influencer (born 1999)

- Born: Issei Toita; August 6, 1999 (age 27); Tokyo, Japan
- Occupations: TikToker; YouTuber

TikTok information
- Page: ISSEI/世界の英雄になる男
- Years active: 2019–present
- Followers: 12.5 million

YouTube information
- Channels: ISSEI / いっせい; AGBOGBLOSHIE STARS
- Years active: 2021–present
- Genre: Comedy
- Subscribers: 76 million (ISSEI / いっせい); 391 thousand (AGBOGBLOSHIE STARS); 76.39 million (combined)
- Views: 61.72 billion (ISSEI / いっせい); 108.71 million (AGBOGBLOSHIE STARS); 61.81 billion (combined)
- Last updated: August 15, 2026

Issei Toita (Japanese: 問田一誠, Hepburn: Toita Issei; born August 6, 1999), professionally known as Issei (Japanese: いっせい; stylized in all caps), is a Japanese YouTuber and TikToker. As of August 2026, he had amassed over 12.5 million followers on TikTok and 76 million subscribers on YouTube, making him the most subscribed Japanese YouTube channel. (Note: Technically, PewDiePie is the most subscribed channel in Japan when he moved in 2022.) He was listed in Forbes Japan's 30 Under 30 in 2025.

== Early life and education ==
Issei Toita was born on August 6, 1999, in Tokyo. In elementary school he was an active member of a cheering squad. From middle school to high school he played baseball, but quit when he developed a serious spinal disease.

== Career ==
Toita started his YouTube channel in 2014. He later stated he originally began using social media in an attempt to start a career in acting. Up until 2019, he was in a talent agency. In 2019, he launched his TikTok account while he was signed to an acting agency. He said that he is having a hard time finding work he envisioned and realized that making a living solely as an actor is incredibly tough. He turned to uploading videos on social media. By then. During that time, vertical short-form videos started getting popular.

Toita has stated that "non-verbal" videos allowed him to gain traction internationally, particularly in India, Indonesia, Vietnam, the Philippines, and Thailand. He originally intended his videos to be watched in Japan. He started uploading short-form videos on his YouTube channel in 2021. He reached 10 million followers on TikTok in 2022. In 2022, his YouTube channel also became popular after he posted a video titled "BODY PUZZLE", which became viral overseas. According to RealSound, seven out of the ten most viewed short YouTube videos in Japan from January to June 2022 were by Issei.

In 2024, his YouTube channel became the most subscribed channel in Japan. He surpassed Jun'ya as the most subscribed Japanese YouTuber channel. On January 8, 2025, he became the first Japanese YouTuber to reach 50 million subscribers.

He was featured in Forbes Japan's "30 Under 30" under the Entertainment & Sports category in the October 2025 issue of the magazine. In August 2025, he launched his second YouTube channel, "AGBOGBLOSHIE STARS", after he visited Agbogbloshie, a suburb in Accra, Ghana. In September 2025, he teamed up with street artist Shingo Nagasaka to carry out activities aimed at "eradicating poverty in Ghana", stating that half of the channel's profit would go into "employment, education, and environmental improvement" in the region.

== Content ==
Toita videos feature comedy videos. He typically does not speak in his videos, conveying intent primarily through gestures, facial expressions, and eye contact. He also uploads vlogs showcasing his daily life and interests, challenge videos, reaction videos, and narrative-driven videos that convey messages to his audience. As of May 2026, he uploaded over 4,700 videos on his YouTube channel.

According to Toita, filming takes place almost every day at a studio in Tokyo. Upon gathering at the studio, the team begins by reviewing previously posted videos and discussing upcoming shoots, then films scenes in areas such as the kitchen and bedroom. After editing the footage, they release an average of about three videos a day. The whole process takes eight to ten hours. He uses a DSLR camera when filming videos.

== Reception ==
Shiki Iwasawa and Takashi Yoshida of The Asahi Shimbun describe Toita’s video as “comically” referencing the fact that he does not say anything in the video, adding that it is comedy that resonates with people all over the world. According to The Asahi Shimbun, he garnered approximately 100 million views annually.

== See also ==
- Hoshimachi Suisei – YouTuber who was also listed in Forbes Japan's 30 Under 30 in 2025
- List of most-subscribed YouTube channels
- List of most-viewed YouTube channels
