= Super Simple Songs =

Canadian YouTube channel

YouTube information
- Channel: Super Simple Songs - Kids Songs
- Years active: 2006–present
- Genres: Education; nursery rhymes
- Subscribers: 46.9 million
- Views: 64.06 billion
- Last updated: 20 September 2026
- Website: supersimple.com

Super Simple Songs is a Canadian YouTube channel and streaming media show created by Devon Thagard and Troy McDonald which publishes animated videos of both traditional nursery rhymes and their own original children's songs. On 30 April, 2021, it became the 105th most-subscribed YouTube channel in the world, the second most-subscribed YouTube channel in Canada after Justin Bieber, with 41.4 million subscribers, the 23rd most-viewed YouTube channel in the world, and the most-viewed YouTube channel in Canada, with 49.7 billion views. The channel has spun off many successful IPs, including but not limited to Noodle & Pals, Rhymington Square and other song series (like Finny The Shark and The Roundabouts).

== History ==
Super Simple Songs was started on 8 September 2006 by teachers of a small English school in Japan. They created their own songs in place of children's songs that were too complex and difficult to be used in teaching. After increasing in popularity from other teachers, they released their first CD. At some point, Super Simple Songs began uploading videos to YouTube. They originally uploaded videos of teaching tips for teachers on how to use their songs in the classroom. They started uploading videos just for kids after realizing that kids were also watching the teaching tips.

Since 2015, Super Simple has been run by a Toronto-based creative production studio company, Skyship Entertainment. In March 2012, Moho Animation Corp. and Sesame Street's Skyship Studios Company announced a content sharing partnership. Super Simple announced a collaboration with The Wiggles in December 2018. In September 2020, Super Simple Songs signed a deal with Warner Music Group's Arts Music division and Warner Chappell Music. At the time, it was ranked as the 36th biggest YouTube channel with 133.4m weekly views, 24.6 million subscribers and 22.8bn lifetime views.

The channel's content is now available through a dedicated mobile app, Amazon Prime Video, and other platforms. In February 2023, Super Simple launched the Super Simple Podcast for children.

== Certified songs ==
Title	Certifications
"10 Little Fishes"	RIAA: Gold
"Apples and Bananas"	RIAA: Platinum
"Baby Shark"	MC: Gold; RIAA: Gold
"Baby Shark Halloween"	RIAA: Gold
"Bingo"	RIAA: Platinum
"Do You Like Brocolli Ice Cream"	RIAA: 2× Platinum
"Do You Like Lasagna Milkshakes"	RIAA: 2× Platinum
"Do You Like Spaghetti Yogurt?"	RIAA: Gold
"Five Little Ducks"	MC: Platinum; RIAA: 3× Platinum; RMNZ: Gold
"Five Little Pumpkins"	RIAA: Platinum
"Five Little Speckled Frogs"	RIAA: Gold
"Give Me Something Good To Eat"	RIAA: Gold
"Go Away, Spooky Goblin!"	RIAA: Gold
"Here Comes The Fire Truck"	RIAA: Gold
"Hickory Dickory...Crash!"	RIAA: Platinum
"How Many Fingers?"	RIAA: Gold
"If You're Happy"	MC: Gold; RIAA: 2× Platinum
"Little Snowflake"	RIAA: Platinum
"Mr. Golden Sun"	RIAA: Gold
"My Happy Song"	RIAA: Gold; ZPAV: Gold
"Old Macdonald"	RIAA: Gold
"Old MacDonald Had a Farm"	MC: Gold; RIAA: Platinum
"One Little Finger"	MC: Gold; RIAA: 2× Platinum
"Open Shut Them"	RIAA: Gold
"Put On Your Shoes"	RIAA: Platinum
"Rain Rain Go Away"	RIAA: Gold
"Skidamarink"	MC: Gold; RIAA: Gold
"Sweet Dreams"	RIAA: Platinum
"Ten in the Bed"	RIAA: Gold
"The Animals On The Farm"	RIAA: Platinum
"The Ants Go Marching"	RIAA: Platinum
"The Ants Go Marching 2"	RIAA: Gold
"The Muffin Man"	RIAA: Platinum
"The Wheels on the Bus"	RIAA: Gold
"This Is The Way"	RIAA: 2× Platinum
"This Is The Way We Get Dressed"	RIAA: Platinum
"Twinkle, Twinkle, Little Star"	MC: 2× Platinum; RIAA: 6× Platinum; RMNZ: Platinum
"Walking In The Jungle"	RIAA: Gold
"Walking Walking"	RIAA: Gold
"Who Took The Cookie"	RIAA: Gold
"Yes, I Can!"	RIAA: Gold
