= Netd.com =

Video on demand website

netd
- Website type: Video on demand
- Available in: Turkish
- Owner: Doğan Media Group
- Website: www.netd.com
- Registration: Optional
- Launched: 11 January 2013
- Current status: Active

netd is a video on demand web site launched in Turkey on 11 January 2013. Netd is owned by Doğan Media Group and offers TV series mostly broadcast on Kanal D, a Doğan Holding channel. As of January 2013, popular TV series like Kuzey Güney, Yalan Dünya, Leyla ile Mecnun, Seksenler, and Öyle Bir Geçer Zaman Ki can be watched online, as well as old popular TV series like Aşk-ı Memnu, Kavak Yelleri and Fatmagül'ün Suçu Ne?. The web site also offers monthly free movies window, Kids Section, TV shows and 6 live broadcasts.

On 24 March 2014, NETD launched its music service with a motto of "Türkçe Müzikte İlk Durak - First Stop For Turkish Music".

All the content is free and ad-supported, there is no paid version. Videos are in up to 720p HD quality, live broadcasting and some content are in SD.

== Competitors ==
The web site launched about one month after Tvyo, a similar service by Doğuş Media Group. Previously, Apple iTunes Store opened for Turkey on 4 December 2012 only for music and films. TTNET also has a similar subscription-based service, Tivibu.

== netd specials ==
netd offers netd.com only shows such as:

- Kaybedenler Kulübü
- Kronos - Mini Serials
- Seksi Sorun
- Ask Para Kariyer
- Evden Uzakta - Music
- Ömür Törpüsü
- Sisenin Dibi
- Sosyal Kafa
- Dehsetin Taniklari
- Sokak Röportajları
- Yan Masa
- Kafa Jello ReklamD

== netd live channels ==
NETD has 9 live channels. Kanal D, CNN Turk, Dream TV, Dream Turk, TV2, Tay TV, DShopping, NetD Live. NETD also started broadcasting Disney Channel Turkey in mid of October 2013. NETD also broadcasts live programs during the day such as Sosyal Kafa (Social media review program), Ask Para Kariyer (Astrology and Angel Cards), and Kaybedenler Kulübü (Live Radio Program).
