= Gangnam Style (music video) =

2012 music video

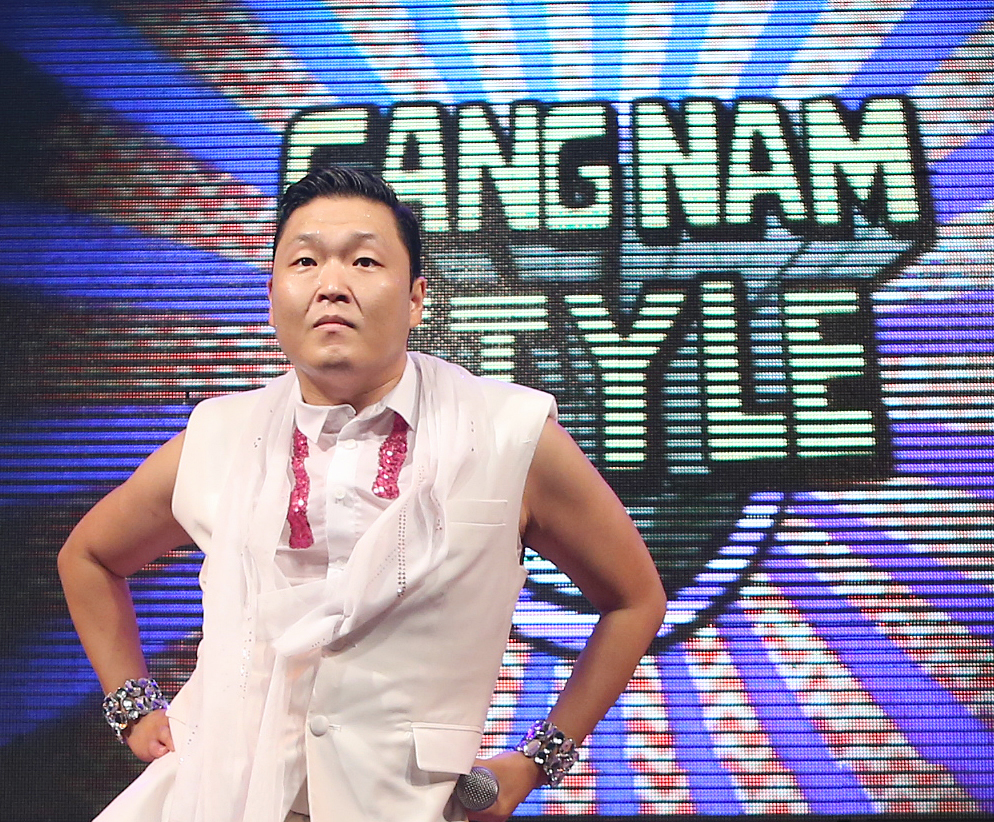
- Psy with the Gangnam Style logo
- Directed by: Cho Soo-hyun
- Starring: Psy; Hwang Min-woo; Yoo Jae-suk; Noh Hong-chul; Hyuna
- Music by: Psy
- Distributed by: YG Entertainment; PolyGram Entertainment (Republic Records and Schoolboy Records)
- Release dates: July 15, 2012 (premiere); October 19, 2012 (download)
- Running time: 4:12
- Country: South Korea
- Language: Korean

The music video for "Gangnam Style" by South Korean singer Psy was one of the most viewed and talked about videos of the 2010s, setting records and gaining international attention for the artist. It premiered on July 15, 2012, on the video-sharing website YouTube and was later made available to download digitally on October 19. It was directed by Cho Soo-hyun and was filmed in Seoul in July 2012 over the course of 48 hours. In the video, Psy "pokes fun at the style of Seoul's Gangnam District, a flashy district known for its affluence, high rents, high expectations and a focus on the high-status lifestyle". On December 21, 2012, the music video set a record for the first video to surpass 1 billion views on the platform. It subsequently surpassed 2 billion, 3 billion, 4 billion, and 5 billion views in June 2014, November 2017 and March 2021, and December 2023, respectively.

The music video won several accolades from various award-giving bodies, including Best Music Video at the 2012 Mnet Asian Music Awards in Hong Kong, the Music Video of the Year at the 2012 Melon Music Awards in Seoul, and Best Video at the 2012 MTV Europe Music Awards in Frankfurt, Germany.

From September 29 to October 1, 2024, the original YouTube video was blocked by SESAC.

== Production ==
The music video is directed by Cho Soo-hyun, who later directed the music video for Psy's follow-up single "Gentleman" and the music video for "This Love" by Shinhwa. It shows Psy performing a comical horse-riding dance and appearing in unexpected locations around the Gangnam District, such as an outdoor yoga session and a hot tub. He wears several distinctive suits and black sunglasses with a "dress classy and dance cheesy" mindset. It features a "skewering [of] the Gangnam image" by the "non-Gangnam Psy"; this parody would be recognizable to viewers familiar with Korean culture. Of the ten-plus locations seen in the video, only two were actually filmed in the Gangnam district. The sauna scene, elevator scene, and bathroom scene were filmed elsewhere in the greater Seoul region, and some shots were filmed in World Trade Center Seoul and the Songdo International Business District, which includes Songdo Central Park and International Business District Station. The video was shot over 48 hours in July 2012.

In K-pop, it is routine to have cameos by celebrities in a music video, such as in the dance scenes in the elevator and the parking garage. The guests in the music video include:

- 4Minute member Hyuna, who dances in the subway car and attracts Psy's attention.
- Hwang Min-woo, a 7-year-old boy who dances at the beginning of the video. During an interview with CNN, Psy stated that "the night before the music video shoot, I was watching Korea's Got Talent and saw him dance to Michael Jackson. His moves were ridiculous. So we called him up and asked him to be in the music video, which was shooting the very next day, and he came and it all worked out." He has been praised for his eye-catching dance moves that have received a lot of attention from viewers.
- Comedian/television personality Korea's Nation emcee Yoo Jae-suk, who engages in a dance duel with Psy.
- Comedian/television personality Noh Hong-chul, who does his trademark pelvis-thrusting dance in an elevator while Psy raps underneath him.

The music was composed by Psy and Yoo Gun-hyung, a producer in South Korea who has also collaborated with Psy in the past. Yoo also arranged the song while Psy was responsible for the lyrics.

== Synopsis ==
Psy and Noh Hong-chul, in the elevator scene in the music video of "Gangnam Style"

The video starts out with Psy, who is lounging at what looks like a sandy beach, under a sun umbrella and holding a cold drink, but the camera zooms out to reveal he is actually at a playground. The video then alternates between the playground, where a boy (Hwang Min-woo) dances next to him; and a row of horses in stalls, where Psy performs his signature "invisible horse dance". As Psy and two girls walk through a parking garage, they are pelted by pieces of newspaper, trash, and snow. At a sauna, dressed in a blue towel, Psy rests his head on a fat man's shoulder while another man covered in tattoos is stretching. He then sings in front of two men playing Janggi (Korean chess), dances with a woman at a tennis court, and bounces around on a tour bus of seniors. The scenes alternate quickly until there is an explosion near the chess players (portrayed by Big Bang members Seungri and Daesung), causing them to jump off the bench. Psy immediately walks towards the camera, pointing and shouting "Oppan Gangnam Style". The chorus starts as he and some dancers perform at a horse stable. He dances as two women walk backwards. He dances at the tennis court, a carousel, and the tour bus. He shuffles into an outdoor yoga session and on a boat. The camera zooms in on a woman's buttocks, then shows Psy "yelling" at it.

The chorus ends and he is seen at a parking lot, where Psy is approached by a man (Yoo Jae-suk) in a yellow suit who steps out of a red Mercedes-Benz SLK 200; they have a dance duel. He then appears in an elevator underneath a man (Noh Hong-chul) who is straddling him and thrusting his pelvis. The man in the yellow suit then gets in his car and leaves. The camera pans and it shows Psy in the subway station, where he boards the train and notices a young woman (Hyuna) dancing. At one of the train stops, he approaches the girl in slow motion, and she does the same. They start to embrace. He then tells the girl "Oppan Gangnam Style", and they horse dance along with some others at the train station, commencing the second chorus. He also surfaces from a spa hot tub. (Note: In the Rolling Stone interview, Psy says he copied the spa surfacing scene from the music video for Lady Gaga's "Poker Face".)

Psy sings to the girl at a night club as people in various costumes walk behind them. He raps in a serious tone in an enclosed space, but when he says "You know what I'm saying" the camera zooms out, and it is revealed that he is actually sitting on a toilet with his pants down. Psy, the girl, and the group of people in costumes do the horse dance and strike a final pose. After a brief reprise of the dance duel, Psy says, "Oppan Gangnam style", and the video finishes with a cartoon graphic of Psy at the stable.

== Popularity ==
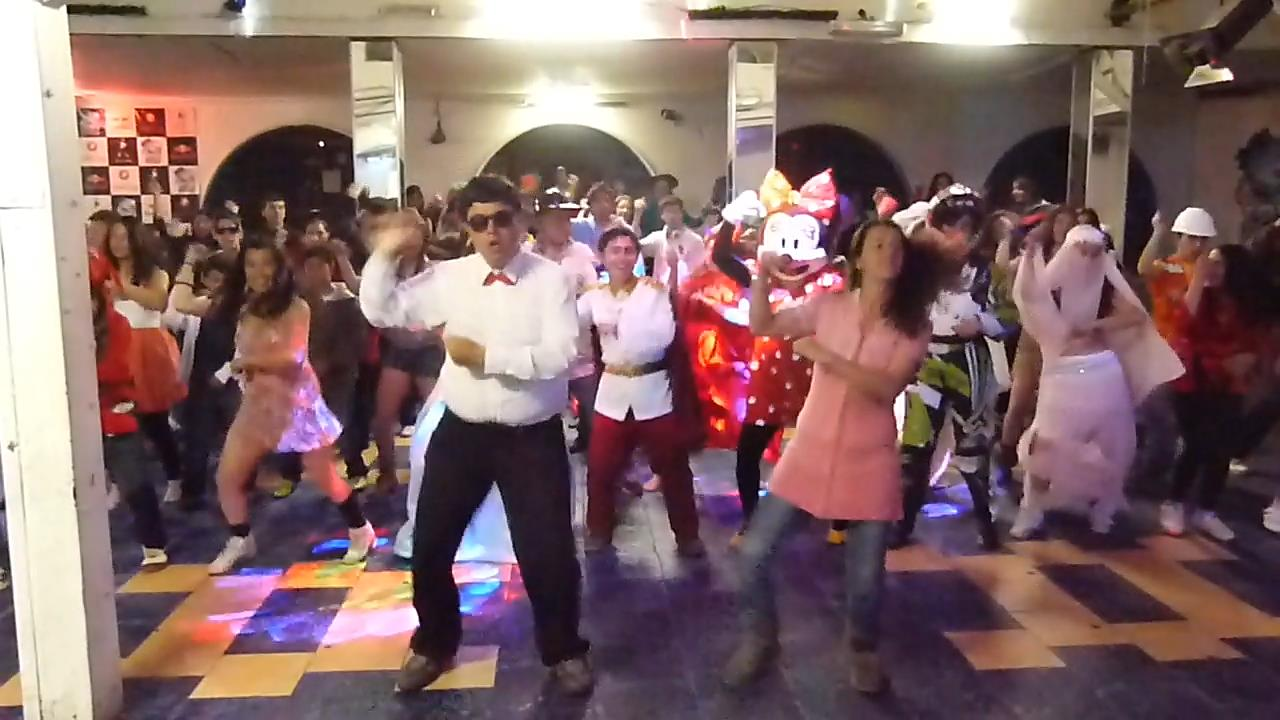
Screenshot of a parody by students from the Colegio de la Preciosa Sangre (Pichilemu, Chile)

After its July 15 release, "Gangnam Style" overtook Carly Rae Jepsen's "Call Me Maybe" to reach the number one position on the YouTube Top 100 Music Videos during the week of August 28, 2012. On September 1, it overtook Girls' Generation's "Gee" to become the most viewed K-pop video on YouTube. Although "Call Me Maybe" had unusually strong staying power, averaging over 1.5 million views each day, "Gangnam Style" increased to an average of over nine million views per day within just two months. Sixty-two percent of viewers were male, and those aged between 13 and 17 represented the biggest group.

According to The Wall Street Journal, T-Pain was among the first to have "sent [the video] to the stratosphere" when he tweeted about it on July 29. It was then picked up by Neetzan Zimmerman from the social blog Gawker, who asked "Did this underground Hip Hop artist from South Korea just release the Best Music Video of the Year?" on July 30. This was soon followed by Robbie Williams, Britney Spears, Katy Perry, Tom Cruise, Joseph Gordon-Levitt, and William Gibson, who have either commented about or shared the video with their fans via Twitter.

The earliest video to catch the attention of media networks outside South Korea was "Psy Gangnam Style MV Reaction", which was uploaded by Katie and Mindy Anderson on July 18, 2012. The Andersons were subsequently interviewed by Evan Ramstad from The Wall Street Journal a few weeks later. In his article published on August 6, 2012, Ramstad also included "Kpop Music Mondays : PSY Gangnam Style", a review and parody of "Gangnam Style" uploaded on July 23 by K-pop video bloggers Simon and Martina Stawski, a Canadian couple living in Seoul. This makes the Stawski's video the earliest parody featured in an American newspaper. On August 8, 2012, Ramstad appeared on WSJ Live, and he mentioned the Andersons and the Stawskis again, before claiming that "a lot of Koreans are also making their own parodies of 'Gangnam Style'".

On September 3, 2012, the number of daily views generated by "Gangnam Style" went past the five-million mark. By the end of September, it had topped the iTunes charts in 31 countries.

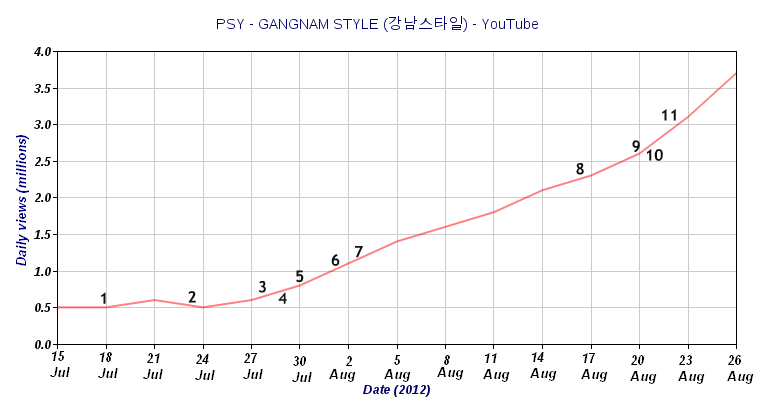
1) Earliest notable reaction video by K-pop fans Katie and Mindy Anderson, uploaded to YouTube on July 18, 2012 2) Earliest notable parody by K-pop bloggers Simon and Martina Stawski, uploaded on July 23 3a) Shared on the social news website Reddit, July 28 3b) Earliest celebrity comment by Robbie Williams on his personal blog, July 28 3c) Featured in the foreign tabloid newspaper Ilta-Sanomat, in Finland, July 28 4) First celebrity tweet by T-Pain, July 29 5) Picked up by Neetzan Zimmerman from the social blog Gawker, July 30 6) Picked up by the British political commentator Andrew Sullivan, who blogs about the video on The Daily Beast, August 1 7) Featured in CNN International and The Wall Street Journal, August 3 8) Nelly Furtado performs "Gangnam Style" at her concert in the Philippines, August 16 9) Psy performs "Gangnam Style" at Dodger Stadium, August 20. This marks his first public appearance in the United States 10) Katy Perry shares the "Gangnam Style" music video with her 25 million followers on Twitter, August 21 11) Psy appears on VH1 with Carrie Keagan and Jason Dundas, August 22. This marks his first appearance in a US television show

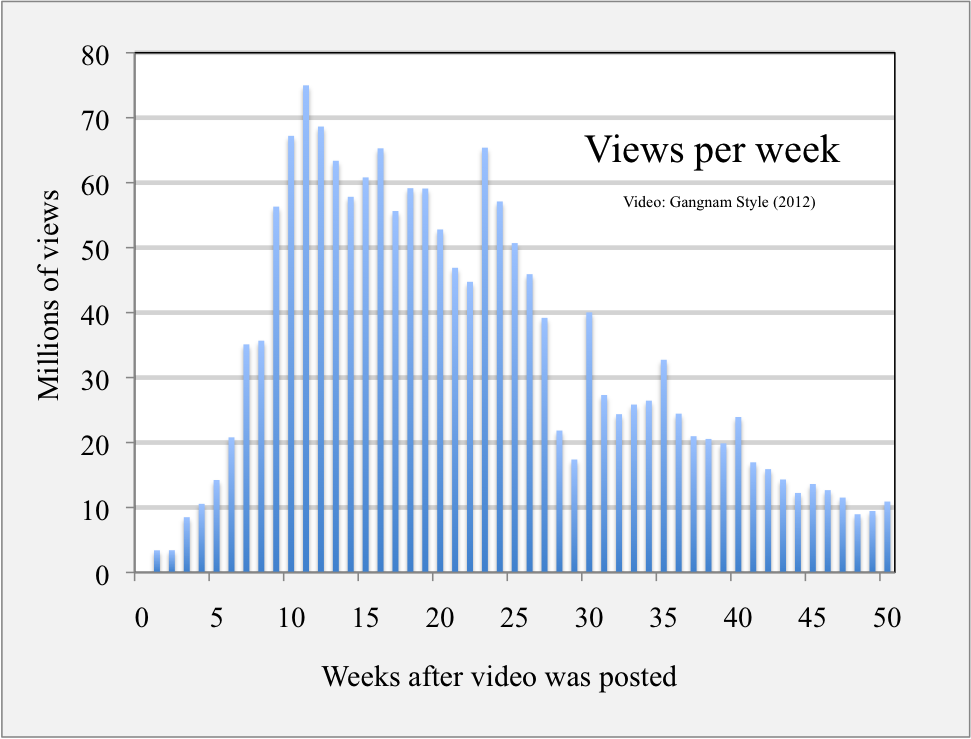
Video views per week, illustrating viral growth to peak viewership in the eleventh week

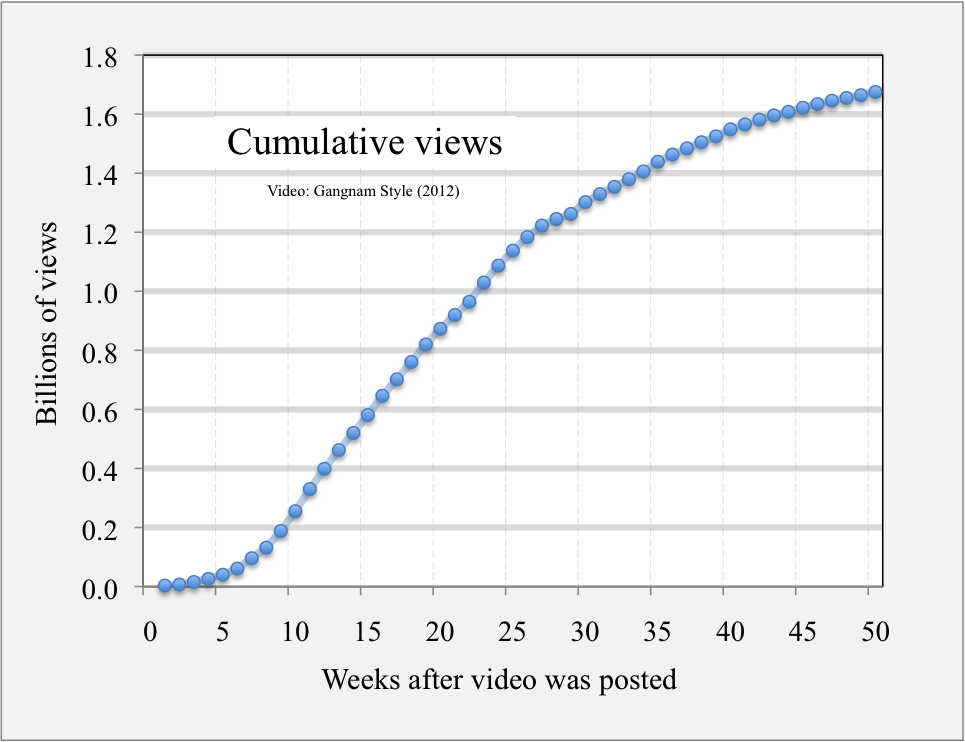
Cumulative views for the first year, leading to stable long-term growth rate

"Gangnam Style" reached the unprecedented milestone of one billion YouTube views on December 21, 2012. A spoof documentary by videographer Simon Gosselin was posted on YouTube and had promoted 2012 doomsday rumors across social media services such as Facebook and Twitter that linked "Gangnam Style" to a fake Nostradamus prophecy. On December 21, at around 15:50 UTC, the video's YouTube page updated with 1,000,382,639 views. YouTube specially marked the video's accomplishments with a cartoon dancing Psy animated icon, added first by the site logo, and later next to the video's view counter when it exceeded a billion views. On April 6, 2013, the video on YouTube reached 1.5 billion views. On June 1, 2014, the music video reached two billion views.

On December 3, 2014, the video reached 2.1 billion views (close to the largest representable number in a 32-bit binary system), and YouTube jokingly wrote on Google+ that it had to change the view counting system to prevent an integer overflow. In fact, YouTube had already updated to a 64-bit integer months before. On January 19, 2016, the video reached 2.5 billion views. On November 25, 2017, the video surpassed 3 billion views.

According to a research by Eötvös University and Ericsson Research in Hungary; and Massachusetts Institute of Technology in the United States, the geographical source of the viral spread of the video is the Philippines and not in South Korea where the video was produced. The researchers concluded the origin of the viral spread after analyzing data in Twitter and verifying the spreading pattern through Google Trends.

=== Records ===
The video has held five records in YouTube history: most-viewed video (held for 1,689 days; surpassed on July 10, 2017, by Wiz Khalifa's "See You Again"), most-rated video (surpassed on February 19, 2017, by "See You Again"), most-discussed video (current), most-liked video (held for 1,444 days; surpassed on August 27, 2016, by "See You Again"), and fastest video to reach 1 billion views (surpassed on January 18, 2016, by Adele's "Hello")

=== View count ===
№ 1 Most-Viewed Video (Jan 2012 – Feb 2018)

Views of music video (billions). View chart definition.

== Critical reception ==
The music video of "Gangnam Style" has been met with positive responses from the music industry and commentators, who drew attention to its tone and dance moves, though some found them vulgar. Another notable aspect that helped popularise the video was its comical dance moves that can be easily copied, such as the pelvic thrust during the elevator scene. The United Nations hailed Psy as an "international sensation" because of the popularity of his "satirical" video clip and its "horse-riding-like dance moves". As such, the music video spawned a dance craze unseen since the Macarena of the mid-1990s.

The World Bank's lead economist David McKenzie remarked that some of Psy's dance moves "kind of look like a regression discontinuity", while the space agency NASA called "Gangnam Style" a dance-filled music video that has forever entered the hearts and minds of millions of people. Melissa Locker of Time noted that "it's hard not to watch again ...and again ...and again", while CNN reporter Shanon Cook told the audience that she had watched "Gangnam Style" about 15 times.

The German news magazine Der Spiegel attributed the popularity of "Gangnam Style" to its daring dance moves, a sentiment similarly voiced by Maura Judkis of The Washington Post, who wrote, "'Gangnam Style' has made an extraordinarily stupid-looking dance move suddenly cool". The video was also positively reviewed by Steve Knopper from Rolling Stone, who called "Gangnam Style" an astoundingly great K-pop video that has all the best elements of hypnotically weird one-hit wonders and hopes that "PSY gets filthy rich from this".

Mesfin Fekadu of the Associated Press wrote that Psy's dance moves are "somewhat bizarre" but that the music video is full of colorful, lively outfits. Matt Buchanan and Scott Ellis of The Sydney Morning Herald wrote that the video "makes no sense at all to most Western eyes" and it "makes you wonder if you have accidentally taken someone else's medication", whereas Deborah Netburn of the Los Angeles Times called it "one of the greatest videos ever to be uploaded to YouTube."

In January 2015, Billboard named the video as one of the 20 best music videos of the 2010s that had been released so far.

== See also ==
- List of most-viewed YouTube videos
