= Shemrock and Shemford =

Private school group in India

Shemrock and Shemford are a group of private pre-, primary, and secondary schools based in India. Founded by Bimla Arora, who opened her first preschool in 1989, and managed by her family, the group expanded to primary and secondary education in 2009. The Limca Book of Records recognized the group in 2013 for starting the most schools in the shortest time: 100 branches in 17 Indian states by 2010 with 225 preschools and 75 primary and secondary schools.

== History ==
The school group began as a chain of preschools. Bimla Arora sought a preschool for her daughter and opened her own in 1989. She became the founding director of the Shemrock preschool group. Her son, Amol Arora, did the marketing for the school and later became vice-chairman of the chain, and his wife, Meenal, became the preschools' executive director. Shemrock expanded to urban areas with the belief that franchise preschools were in higher demand there. Their classes have 12 students and are designed to be interactive, with individual attention for each child. Amol Arora distinguished the chain's preschools from others by classroom environment, curriculum, and approach to schooling. In one school, new students acclimate to the school in a "welcome home", with toys including a doll house, television with nursery rhymes, and shaped blocks. The kids progress to an Activity Area with a wooden stage, writing area, sandpit, and technology such as a smartphone and ATM counter. Shemrock teaches the alphabet through objects and tie letters to modern technology, such as ATMs and Blackberry devices.

Shemrock preschools use the Chota Bheem cartoon character as their "brand ambassador" with expectations that the character would engage and motivate children to learn. Their in-house marketing team led a campaign to use the character in class activities, and released their first television commercial with the character in 2013. Shemrock celebrated one school opening in 2013 with a carnival.

The Aroras expanded into primary and secondary education in 2009 with Shemford Futuristic Schools. Meenal Arora was their founding director. The first Shemford school was opened in Ashok Vihar and later led to offshoots in Bagh, Noida, Punjab, Rohini, and Patna. By 2012, there were 22 Shemford secondary schools in India, and plans to open 15 more across Tamil Nadu over three years. The secondary schools are either associated with the Central Board of Secondary Education or the Indian Certificate of Secondary Education.

The school follows a proprietary curriculum known as ShemEduMAX that is designed as a "child created curriculum" with "personalized assessment". At the school's 2011 opening, Arora said over 160 Indian schools used the curriculum.

The Shemrock and Shemford group was recognized by the Limca Book of Records in 2013 for starting the most schools in the shortest time. By 2014, the group had opened 100 branches in 17 Indian states, with 225 preschools across India and over 75 Shemford schools. In 2012, the Shemrock and Shemford schools employed about 3,000 in staff for 20,000 students, and planned to expand to 900 teachers within five years.
