= Like button =

Communication software feature used to express support

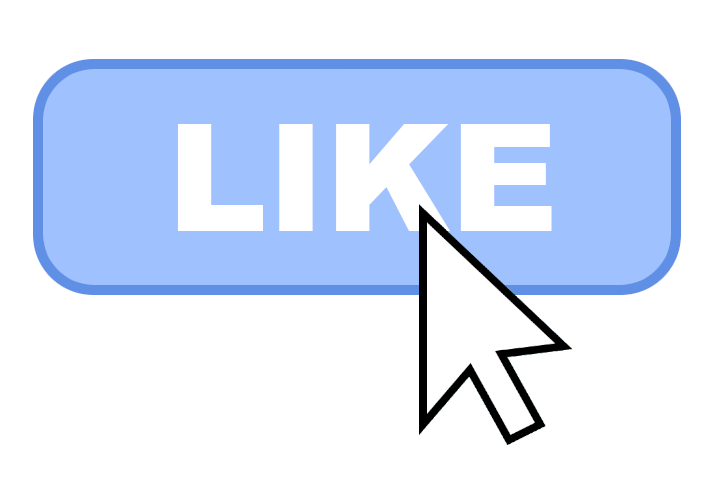
Example of a like button

A like button, like option, or recommend button is a feature in communication software such as social networking services, Internet forums, news websites and blogs where the user can express that they like or support certain content. Internet services that feature like buttons usually display the number of users who liked the content, and may show a full or partial list of them. This is a quantitative alternative to other methods of expressing reaction to content, like writing a reply text. It is the most used feature on social media.

Some websites also include a dislike button, so the user can either vote in favor, against or neutrally. Other websites include more complex web content voting systems; for example, five stars or reaction buttons to show a wider range of emotion to the content.

== Implementations ==
=== Vimeo ===
Video sharing site Vimeo added a "like" button in November 2005. Developer Andrew Pile describes it as an iteration of the "digg" button from the site Digg.com, saying "We liked the Digg concept, but we didn't want to call it 'Diggs,' so we came up with 'Likes'".

=== FriendFeed ===
The like button on FriendFeed was announced as a feature on October 30, 2007, and was popularized within that community. Later the feature was integrated into Facebook before FriendFeed was acquired by Facebook on August 10, 2009.

=== Facebook ===
The "Like" icon used by Facebook

The Facebook like button is designed as a hand giving "thumbs up". During development, engineers, including Andrew Bosworth, Leah Pearlman and Justin Rosenstein, initially considered designs based on a star, a plus/minus button, or a heart, and the feature was internally referred to as the "awesome button" before being renamed at Mark Zuckerberg's direction. It was introduced on 9 February 2009. In February 2016, Facebook introduced reactions - a new way to express people's emotions to Facebook posts. These reactions include "Love", "Haha", "Wow", "Sad", and "Angry".

The "like" button influences Facebook's algorithm by affecting how content is ranked and distributed in users' feeds. On the other hand, a study highlights the disadvantage of the "like" reaction in algorithmic content ranking on Facebook. The "like" button can increase the engagement, but can decrease the organic reach as a "brake effect of viral reach".

=== YouTube ===
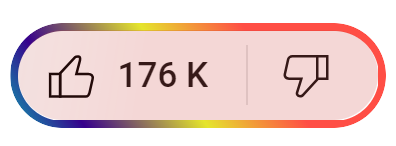
The YouTube Like button "glows" every time a creator says "Smash that Like button."

In early 2010, as part of a broader redesign of the service, YouTube switched from a star-based rating system to Like/Dislike buttons. Under the previous system, users could rate videos on a scale from 1 to 5 stars; YouTube staff argued that this change reflected common usage of the system, as 2-, 3-, and 4-star ratings were not used as often. In 2012, YouTube briefly experimented with replacing the Like and Dislike buttons with a Google+ +1 button.

In 2019, after the backlash from YouTube Rewind 2018, YouTube began considering options to combat "dislike mobs," including an option to completely remove the dislike button. The video is the most disliked video on YouTube, passing the music video for Justin Bieber's "Baby".

On November 12, 2021, YouTube announced it will make dislike counts private, with only the content creator being able to view the number of dislikes on the back end, in what the company says is an effort to combat targeted dislike and harassment campaigns and encourage smaller content creators.

On October 17, 2023, with an update on the website, views and likes will be updated periodically during the first 24 hours of a new video. Additionally, the Like button will "glow" when a creator asks their viewers to press the Like button.

In addition to videos, each of their user comments also have its own set of Like and Dislike buttons since August 2007. The feature was originally implemented in a similar fashion to Reddit's system of Upvotes and Downvotes until a greater redesign of the comment system in September 2013 (initially oriented on Google+), since which – while comments continue to show their Likes count – Dislikes won't be made public and thus have no visible effect on a comment's rating.

Since June 2026, YouTube has removed the dislike button in the Shorts section, in addition to changing the thumbs-up icon to a heart.

=== Google+ ===
+1, the "Like" button of Google+ (old version)

Google+ had a like button called the +1 (Internet slang for "I like that" or "I agree"), which was introduced in June 2011. In August 2011, the +1 button also became a share icon.

=== Reddit ===
Upvote and downvote buttons on Reddit

On Reddit (a system of message boards), users can upvote and downvote posts (and comments on posts). The votes contribute to posters' and commenters' "karma" (Reddit's name for a user's overall rating).

=== X / Twitter ===
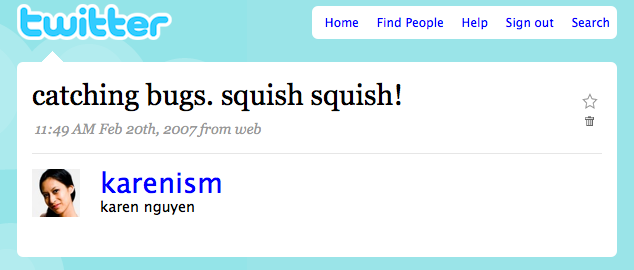
A tweet on Twitter in 2007 with a star icon to the right as its "favorite" button

Alongside reposts (commonly known as retweets), X (formerly Twitter) users can like posts made on the service, indicated by a heart. Until November 2015, the equivalent of "liking a tweet" was "favoriting a tweet" and favorites were symbolized by a gold star. However, that was changed to alleviate user confusion and put the function more in line with other social networks, the favorite function was renamed to like.

Previously users were able users to see which tweets others have liked under a likes tab in a user's profile. Though in June 2024 this feature was removed across the site thus making likes private for all users.

In July 2024 it was reported that a "dislike" button featuring a broken heart icon was being tested as an addition to the site.

=== VK ===
VK like buttons for posts, comments, media and external sites operate in a different way from Facebook. Liked content doesn't get automatically pushed to the user's wall, but is saved in the (private) Favorites section instead.

=== Instagram ===
The Instagram like button is indicated by a heart symbol. In addition to tapping the heart symbol on a post, users can double tap an image to "like" it. In May 2019, Instagram began tests wherein the number of likes on a user's post is hidden from other users.

=== TikTok ===
The TikTok like button is indicated by a heart symbol, and users can use the like button by double tapping on a post they like, similar to YouTube Shorts and Instagram. Liked content can be accessed via the "Liked" tab on a user's profile.

Additionally in 2022, TikTok implemented a Dislike button for their user comments with the intent of giving their users power to identify comments that are considered "irrelevant or inappropriate". Just like on YouTube ever since the late 2013 overhaul of their comment system, these dislikes are not visible to others.

=== XWiki ===
XWiki, the application wiki and open source collaborative platform, added the "Like" button in version 12.7. This button allows users to like wiki pages. It is possible to see all liked pages and the Like counter for each page.

=== LinkedIn ===
The business and employment social media LinkedIn includes a "like" button. In 2019 the platform added reaction options such as "celebrate", "love", "insightful" and "support".

== Legal issues ==
In 2012, following the death of Indian political leader Bal Thackeray, two women were arrested related to a Facebook post about the death. One of the women posted the status update, and her friend had liked it. The arrest under sections of the Indian Penal Code and the Information Technology Act caused a national outrage against freedom of speech and misuse of the Information Technology laws. After an enquiry that concluded that the arrests were avoidable and not justified, and recommended action against the arresting policemen, the allegations were dropped, the police officers suspended, and the magistrate involved in the case was transferred.

In 2017, a man was fined 4,000 Swiss francs by a Swiss regional court for liking defamatory messages on Facebook written by other people which criticized an activist. According to the court, the defendant "clearly endorsed the unseemly content and made it his own".

== See also ==
- Likejacking – Malicious technique of tricking a Web user
- Moderation system – System to sort undesirable contributions
- Recommender system – System to predict users' preferences
- Surfbook – Feature of the social networking website Facebook
- Trust metric – Term in psychology and sociology
