= The Wheels on the Bus =

American children's song written by Verna Hills

Song
- Language: English
- Published: December 1937
- Genre: Children's; folk
- Songwriter: Verna Hills

"The Wheels on the Bus" is an American folk song written by Verna Hills (1898–1990) of Boston, Massachusetts. The earliest known publishing of the lyrics is the December 1937 issue of American Childhood, originally called "The Bus", with the lyrics being "The wheels of the bus", with each verse ending in lines relevant to that verse, as opposed to the modern standard "all through the town" (or "all day long" in some versions).

It is a popular children's song in the United Kingdom, the United States, Australia, Canada, New Zealand, Sweden, Norway, Italy, Denmark, the Netherlands, and Brazil. The song has a repetitive rhythm, making the song easy to sing, in a manner similar to the song "99 Bottles of Beer". It is based on the traditional British song "Here We Go Round the Mulberry Bush". The song is also sometimes sung to the tune of "Buffalo Gals", as in the versions done by Raffi Cavoukian and The Wiggles.

== Tune and lyrics ==
Each verse lists a mechanical part or type of person found on a bus and describes the motion or sound associated with it, beginning with the wheels. The remaining features may be improvised, similar to the animals in "Old MacDonald Had a Farm". The following is an example rendition of the song:

1. The wheels on the bus go round and round
Round and round
Round and round
The wheels on the bus go round and round
All through the town

2. The wipers on the bus go, "Swish, swish, swish"
"Swish, swish, swish"
"Swish, swish, swish"
The wipers on the bus go, "Swish, swish, swish"
All through the town

3. The door on the bus goes, "Open and shut"
"Open and shut"
"Open and shut"
The door on the bus goes, "Open and shut"
All through the town

4. The driver on the bus goes, "Move on back"
"Move on back"
"Move on back"
The driver on the bus goes, "Move on back"
All through the town

5. The people on the bus go up and down
Up and down
Up and down
The people on the bus go up and down
All through the town

6. The horn on the bus goes, "Beep, beep, beep"
"Beep, beep, beep"
"Beep, beep, beep"
The horn on the bus goes, "Beep, beep, beep"
All through the town

7. The baby on the bus goes, "Wah, Wah, Wah"
"Wah, wah, wah"
"Wah, Wah, Wah"
The baby on the bus goes, "Wah, Wah, Wah"
All through the town

8. The mommies on the bus go, "Shh, shh, shh"
"Shh, shh, shh"
"Shh, shh, shh"
The mommies on the bus go, "Shh, shh, shh"
All through the town

9. The daddies on the bus says, "I love you"
"I love you"
"I love you"
The daddies on the bus says, "I love you"
All through the town

Normally followed by "The wipers on the bus go swish swish swish" (with action), "the horn on the bus goes beep beep beep", and "the people on the bus go up and down" (with action). Some versions substitute "bounce up and down" for "go up and down", and some modern commercial recordings of the song in children's toys simplify the tune by copying notes 7 through 9 onto notes 13 through 15.

Lyrics as they were originally found in the December 1937 issue of American Childhood:

1. The wheels of the bus go round and round,
Round and round, round and round;
The wheels of the bus go round and round,
Over the city streets.

2. The horn of the bus goes "Too-to-too,
"Too-to-too, too-to-too,"
the horn of the bus goes "Too-to-too"
At the other busses it meets.

3. The people in the bus go up and down,
Up and down,
up and down;
The people in the bus go up and down,
Bouncing off their seats.

Modern versions of the song change the lyrics in the seventh verse to say the daddies on the bus go "I love you". This can be seen in the popular remake by the children’s show Cocomelon.

Note that this version does not make any reference to the melody that is commonly attached to the song.

== Other recordings ==
"The Wheels on the Bus"

Single by Mad Donna
- B-side: "Hush, Little Baby"
- Released: 4 May 2002
- Length: 2:25
- Label: Star Harbour; All Around The World Disco 0202R
- Songwriter: Verna Hills

In 2002, American Madonna impersonator Michelle Chappel, under the stage name "Mad Donna", released a single which sampled the song, featuring a version of Madonna's 1998 song "Ray of Light" over which the classic children's song was sung. The single reached No. 17 in the United Kingdom and also made the charts elsewhere in Europe.

In 2018, the YouTube channel Cocomelon uploaded a cover and music video of the song; this video has amassed more than nine billion views and is, as of July 2026, the second most viewed videos on the site of all time.
