= D Billions =

Kyrgyz musical group

YouTube information
- Channel: D Billions
- Years active: 2019–present
- Genres: Children's educational entertainment; Musical comedy; Nursery rhymes and sing-along songs
- Subscribers: 37.1 million
- Views: 54.87 billion
- Last updated: 05 July, 2026

D Billions is a children's music group and YouTube channel based in the Kyrgyz Republic, known for producing content for young audiences. The channel's most popular video, "Yummy Fruits & Vegetables" has garnered over 3.5 billion views. Additional popular videos include "My Name Is Chicky" which became a viral TikTok phenomenon in 2022, and "Clap, Clap, Cha Cha Cha!" which has surpassed over 2.7 billion views on YouTube. The channel features four characters: Cha-Cha, Lya-Lya, Boom-Boom, and Chicky, each portrayed by different performers.

== Content ==
D Billions creates engaging educational songs and dance videos for preschool children using catchy songs, captivating storylines, and vibrant 3D and 2D animations. The content helps children learn to count, recognize colors, understand healthy nutrition, develop care for animals and the environment, and increase awareness about safety.

=== Most Popular Videos ===
D Billions' most-viewed and most influential videos showcase the channel's diverse approach to children's entertainment:

- "Yummy Fruits & Vegetables" – The channel's most popular video with over 3.5 billion views. The song combines educational content about nutrition with the group's signature energetic dance style.
- "My Name Is Chicky" – Achieved significant viewership and became a viral TikTok trend in 2022. The song's simple, memorable hook made it one of the most imitated videos on the platform, with millions of user-created variations. This trend contributed to D Billions' international recognition and was featured in Eurovision 2022 promotional materials.
- "Clap, Clap, Cha Cha Cha!" – With over 2.7 billion views on YouTube, this video is one of the channel's most popular releases.
- "123 Song" – Features the channel's educational approach, teaching numbers in English through music and dance.

== History ==
The group was founded by Ernist Umetaliev, who is the owner and producer of Ekarecords, a prominent music production and recording studio based in Kyrgyzstan. The D Billions YouTube channel was launched on July 27, 2019, with their debut video, "Left! Right! | D Billions Kids Songs" released on August 8, 2019. The video, showcasing a simple English song with a catchy tune, has garnered over 90 million views.

D Billions has its roots in Ak Shoola (Ак Шоола), a theatrical children's choir based in Kyrgyzstan with a 40-year history and a recipient of the State Prize of the Kyrgyz Republic. The choir is directed by Gulmira Esengulova, the mother of D Billions founder Ernist Umetaliev, an accomplished musician and educator, and author of numerous acclaimed children's songs in the Kyrgyz language. Many of the musicians in D Billions are alumni of Ak Shoola, continuing the choir's musical legacy in a popular and entertaining format.

=== Characters and performers ===
The group comprises four main characters, each distinguished by their colorful costumes.

- Boom-Boom: Played by Zhanyshbek Zhenishbekov, a singer and performer known professionally as "Johnny". Boom-Boom wears red and blue, with a red wig.
- Cha-Cha: Played by Anakul uulu Asylbek, a singer and performer known professionally as "Asko". Cha-Cha wears blue and yellow, with a blue wig.
- Chicky: Played by Baktybek Ismanaliyev, Chicky wears yellow and red, with a yellow wig.
- Lya-Lya: Played by Angelina Ee (previously played by Darina Vekua), Lya-Lya joined the group in June 2020. She wears blue, yellow, and pink, with a pink wig.

=== Character Variations and Formats ===
The main characters on the D Billions channel appear in various formats and creative styles. In addition to their primary live-action performances, the characters are presented as baby versions (Baby Cha-Cha, Baby Chicky, Baby Boom-Boom, and Baby Lya-Lya), as puppets, and in various other creative formats. This diversity allows the group to reach different audiences and create content with varied aesthetics and storytelling approaches, enhancing the appeal of their educational and entertainment programming.

== Notable achievements ==
D Billions has achieved remarkable success across multiple YouTube channels in different languages. The group has received three YouTube Diamond Play Buttons (awarded for reaching 10 million subscribers) for their main English-language channel, their Spanish-language channel, and their Russian-language channel, each boasting over 10 million subscribers.

In May 2023, D Billions was officially acknowledged by local authorities as a significant cultural export of Kyrgyz Republic. The group was awarded an honorary certificate in recognition of their "notable contribution to the development of the nation."

== Live performances ==
The group's live shows have attracted substantial audiences, with their first concert setting a record attendance of over 60,000 people in Bishkek, Kyrgyzstan, marking it as the largest live show attendance in the city's history.
