= ChuChu TV =

Indian YouTube channel

YouTube information
- Channel: ChuChu TV Nursery Rhymes & Kids Songs
- Years active: 2013–present
- Genre: Edutainment
- Subscribers: 98.1 million
- Views: 58.2 billion
- Last updated: 4 February 2026
- Website: chuchutv.com

ChuChu TV is an Indian network of YouTube channels that creates edutainment content for children from ages 1 to 6. The network offers animated 2D and 3D videos featuring traditional nursery rhymes, available in English, Hindi, Tamil and other languages, as well as original children's songs, stories and Surprise Eggs videos. As of February 2026, ChuChu TV became the 18th most-subscribed channel on the platform YouTube.

== History ==
ChuChu TV began in 2013 when an Indian tech engineer, Vinoth Chandar, made a cartoon for his young daughter (nicknamed "ChuChu") so that she could learn and laugh. He animated the classic nursery rhyme "Chubby Cheeks" with a cute little girl character based on his daughter. He shared it on YouTube and — to his surprise — it quickly got over 300,000 views in just a few weeks. The video, based on "Chubby Cheeks", received over three hundred thousand views in two weeks. Encouraged by this, Chandar and his four childhood friends (B. M. Krishnan, T. S. Subbiramanian, Ajith Togo, and Suresh Bhoopathy) turned their side hobby into ChuChu TV Studios. They pooled money from an earlier small IT business they called Buddies Infotech. In short order, they produced their second video based on "Twinkle Twinkle Little Star" and saw their subscribers climb from a handful to 5,000 to invest in animations. As Chandar describes it, ChuChu TV was created "for his daughter" and from the start aimed to be "fun, entertaining stories as a teaching tool" for kids age 1 to 6. In practice, the team spent months researching and planning each video: they chose rhymes or stories that children loved, wrote new happy lyrics, and scored them with energetic music. Chandar handled the music, while partner Krishnan and others rewrote and wrote lyrics.

A YouTube partnerships manager praised their approach: early viewers noticed ChuChu's "techie" beats and positive spin on classic rhymes, which made the videos very appealing to toddlers. As one YouTube executive said, "Nursery rhymes have an inherent negativity in them. ChuChu TV's extension of the lyrics to give it a positive spin works."

After the first few hits, ChuChu TV took off. By April 2015, the channel had over 1 million subscribers. In 2017 it won YouTube's Diamond Button (for 10 million subs), and by 2020 the main channel hit 50 million subs. (ChuChu TV's network of channels together has grown even larger.) From 2014 onward, the team focused on quality over quantity: they produced only about 10–15 videos a month, each carefully polished. As Chandar explains, "for us it's about quality versus quantity" – they would rather release a few perfect videos than dozens of average ones.

By 2017 ChuChu TV was, according to Gadgets360, the #1 YouTube channel in the Asia-Pacific and #2 globally in the education genre. It also became 15th most popular overall worldwide.

Today, ChuChu TV Studios has grown to about 200 animators, editors and artists (up from 4 in the beginning) all working in a large Chennai office. The five founder-partners (Chandar, Krishnan, Subbiramanian, Togo, and Bhoopathy) each have a role. Chandar is CEO, creative director, and composer; Krishnan leads the lyrics and creative team, Subbiramanian heads finance and partnerships; Togo handles legal; and Bhoopathy runs operations. Along with these core leaders, a team of voice actors, singers and animators (many of them parents themselves) bring ChuChu's songs and stories to life. As Chandar puts it, "my partner Krishnan and I take care of this channel full time, supported by our other partners and close friends."

== Content style ==
The videos feature a bright art style, with cute characters dancing, singing, and playing out what the lyrics describe, under music with Bollywood song structure, including multiple riffs between verses. ChuChu TV is not just one YouTube channel but a network of channels and series for kids. The main channel, ChuChu TV Nursery Rhymes & Kids Songs, features 2D and 3D animated versions of traditional songs like Twinkle, Twinkle Little Star or "Baa, Baa, Black Sheep" (with brighter, kinder lyrics). In addition, there are specialized channels:

- ChuChu TV Surprise - 2D animated "surprise egg" style videos that mix playful toy-unboxing with learning, Inspired by the YouTube sensation of nursery rhymes and surprise egg unboxing videos.
- ChuChu TV Storytime - 2D animated bedtime stories, nursery tales and 2D animated comedy series.
- ChuChu TV FunZone - 3D Animated rhymes and videos.

== Merchandising ==
In 2016, ChuChu TV announced a licensing and merchandising partnership with DreamTheatre and to be able to change some of ChuChu TV's beloved characters into a then-new rebrand. In 2018, ChuChu TV inked a partnership with Australian media company Moose Toys to make a line of figurines, dolls and plushes, planning to reveal them in the fall of 2019, with apparel, publishing and back-to-school ranges also planned for 2019.

The ChuChu TV Network now spans 12 YouTube channels in different languages (English, Hindi, Tamil, Telugu, Bengali, Spanish, Portuguese, French, etc.) They also produce seasonal or themed web series (e.g Learning English Is Fun!) and include educational content like counting or phonics. ChuChu TV's content also moved beyond YouTube. They created an app and appeared on platforms like Amazon Prime Video, Netflix (formerly) and Kidoodle.TV (offering 30+ videos in a bundle).

In 2018, ChuChu TV partnered up with Skoolbo, an award-winning media learning company to launch a learning app called ChuChuSchool which is currently unavailable. The ChuChuSchool app offers curriculum-based learning modules from pre- school to Grade 2 with over 500 eBooks, songs and lessons which cover reading, numbers, basic geography, science, brain games, puzzles, stories and songs. The App features 150 audio story books and 50 learning songs as well.

== Reception ==
The channel gained acceptance from parents and a large audience, especially in the United States. However, a backlash developed, with an average of 30%+ dislikes. Chandar has referred specifically to the Johny Johny Yes Papa compilation comments as "very hateful" and claims trolls "just don't understand that [their] content is for toddlers". Parents reacted to The Numbers Song with the lyrics, "Shoot the numbers with the gun", to represent shooting toy targets which encouraged ChuChu TV to quickly edit the video by changing the lyric to " Jump on numbers just for fun" as well as changing the animation. Asian parents did not react to the lyrics, due to different views on guns in Asia. Chandar explains: "We never thought about it. We removed the gun, changed the lyric, changed the animation, and re-uploaded the video… we take this seriously because finally it's the parents that decide what their kids should watch."
