= Pinkfong =

South Korean educational entertainment company

- Formerly: Smart Books (2010-2012)
- Type: Children's entertainment brand
- Industry: Media
- Founded: June 2010; 16 years ago
- Headquarters: Seocho-dong, Seoul, South Korea
- Key people: Kim Min-seok (CEO); Lee Seung-kyu (CFO)
- Parent: The Pinkfong Company
- Website: www.pinkfong.com

Pinkfong (Korean: 핑크퐁) is an English-language South Korean children's educational brand of The Pinkfong Company (previously known as Smart Study and Smart Books Media), a South Korean educational entertainment company. Pinkfong content consists mainly of children's songs, the most famous of which is a version of "Baby Shark". The dance video associated with that song eventually became the most-viewed YouTube video with over 17 billion views as of August 2026. Their channel consists of songs, stories, and dances that are represented by a pink fox named Pinkfong.

As of 2018, the company has more than 4,000 kids' songs, stories, video games and merchandise.

== History ==
=== Formation ===
Pinkfong began as The Pinkfong Company at their Seoul headquarters, in June 2010. It also has offices in Los Angeles, U.S. and Shanghai, China. Its focus is children aged 1–5. By 2015, the company had released 520 mobile games, with core games like "Pinkfong Nursery Rhymes", and a program with central items including "Pinkfong English".

=== Pinkfong Baby Shark ===
Pinkfong Baby Shark - Kids Songs & Stories (previously titled as Pinkfong! Kids' Songs & Stories) is a YouTube channel for kids filled with preschool songs, nursery rhymes and stories. The songs and stories generally are of one to two minutes. They can also be in compilation videos. In addition to animation, some of them might include clay animation and child actors. The short length was made to accommodate cell phone views on both YouTube and The Pinkfong Company's education mobile apps.

=== Pinkfong Wonderstar ===
Pinkfong Wonderstar is an animated web series with two main animal characters named Pinkfong and Hogi. The two animal characters are a fox and a hedgehog who live in a town named Wonderville. These two characters interact with various people in Wonderville. Its first episode, named "Welcome to Wonderville" (previously titled as "Pinkfong and Hogi"), was released on June 27, 2019, for KBS2. It also released on December 3, 2020, for YouTube Originals.

== Discography ==
=== Charted compilation albums ===
Title	Album details	Peak chart positions	
Title	Album details	US	UK
Pinkfong Presents: The Best of Baby Shark	Released: November 30, 2018; Label: Smart Study; Format: LP, digital download, streaming	100	29

=== Charted songs ===
Title	Year	Peak chart positions						Certifications	Album
Title	Year	US	CAN	IRE	SCO	UK	WW	Certifications	Album
Baby Shark	2015	32	39	22	12	6	38	RIAA: 11× Platinum; FIMI: Platinum; ZPAV: Platinum; BPI: 5× Platinum	Pinkfong Presents: The Best of Baby Shark
