= Baby Shark =

Children's song popularized in 2016

"Baby Shark" is a children's song and YouTube music video associated with a dance involving hand movements, dating back to the late 20th century. "Baby Shark" became popular when Pinkfong, a South Korean entertainment company, released a version of the song on June 17, 2016, with a YouTube Music video which went viral on social media, in online videos, and on the radio. In November 2020, Pinkfong's version became the most-viewed YouTube video of all time, after gaining 7.04 billion views. In January 2022, it became the first YouTube video to reach 10 billion views.

== History ==
=== Origins ===
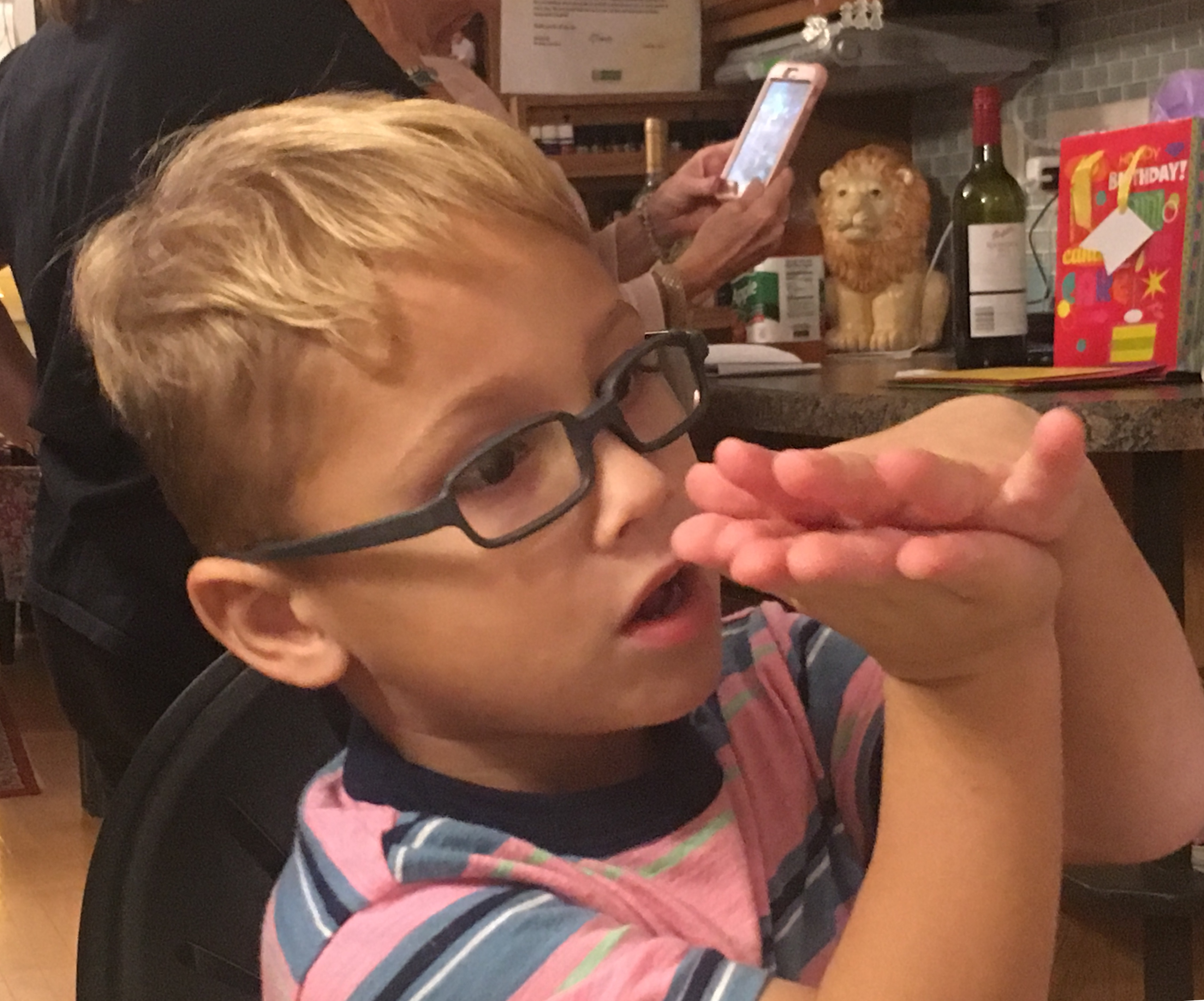
A boy doing the "Baby Shark" dance

The original song dates back to the 20th century. Various entities have tried to copyright original videos and sound recordings of the song, but according to The New York Times, the underlying song and characters are believed to be in the public domain, as the song has been a popular camp sing-along for decades.

A dance version of "Baby Shark" was popularized in the 2007 YouTube video "Kleiner Hai" (German for Little Shark) published by Alexandra Müller, also known by her stage name Alemuel. This version, set to the theme of Jaws, tells the story of a baby shark who grows up and eats a swimmer. The video quickly gained popularity. The single peaked at 25th in the German charts and at 21st in the Austrian charts. The German version of the song remains popular among German youth groups, and multiple variations, also in different dialects of German, have been published.

Jonathan Wright, a children's entertainer from Endwell, New York, known as Johnny Only, was a DJ at a kids' summer camp in the 1990s where the counselors regularly performed the song with the campers. He saw how engaged and animated the campers were when "Baby Shark" was performed. When he became a full-time children's entertainer, he released a version of the song aimed at toddlers by removing any violent imagery, instead focusing on the family. The version was released in 2011.

=== Pinkfong version ===
"Baby Shark" was popularized by a version of the song produced by Pinkfong, an education brand owned by South Korean entertainment company SmartStudy (now The Pinkfong Company). The original music video for "Baby Shark" (Korean: 아기 상어; RR: Agi sangeo) without child actors was uploaded on November 25, 2015. All videos related to Pinkfong's song had gained about 5 billion views by January 2020. The most popular version of Pinkfong's videos, "Baby Shark Dance", was uploaded on June 17, 2016. This version was sung by then-10-year-old Korean-American singer Hope Segoine, and the music video featured two child actors, Park Geon Roung of South Korea and Elaine Kim Johnston of New Zealand. On November 2, 2020, more than four years after it was first uploaded, this version amassed 7.04 billion views to become the most-viewed YouTube video of all time, surpassing Luis Fonsi's "Despacito".

The song starts with bars from Antonín Dvořák's Symphony No. 9, which sounds similar to music from the film Jaws. "Baby Shark" features a family of sharks that hunt a school of fish which escape to safety. It became a viral video in Indonesia in 2017, and throughout the year it spread to many other Asian countries, particularly those in Southeast Asia. The related mobile app surpassed 150 million downloads and was top ranked in 112 countries in 2017.

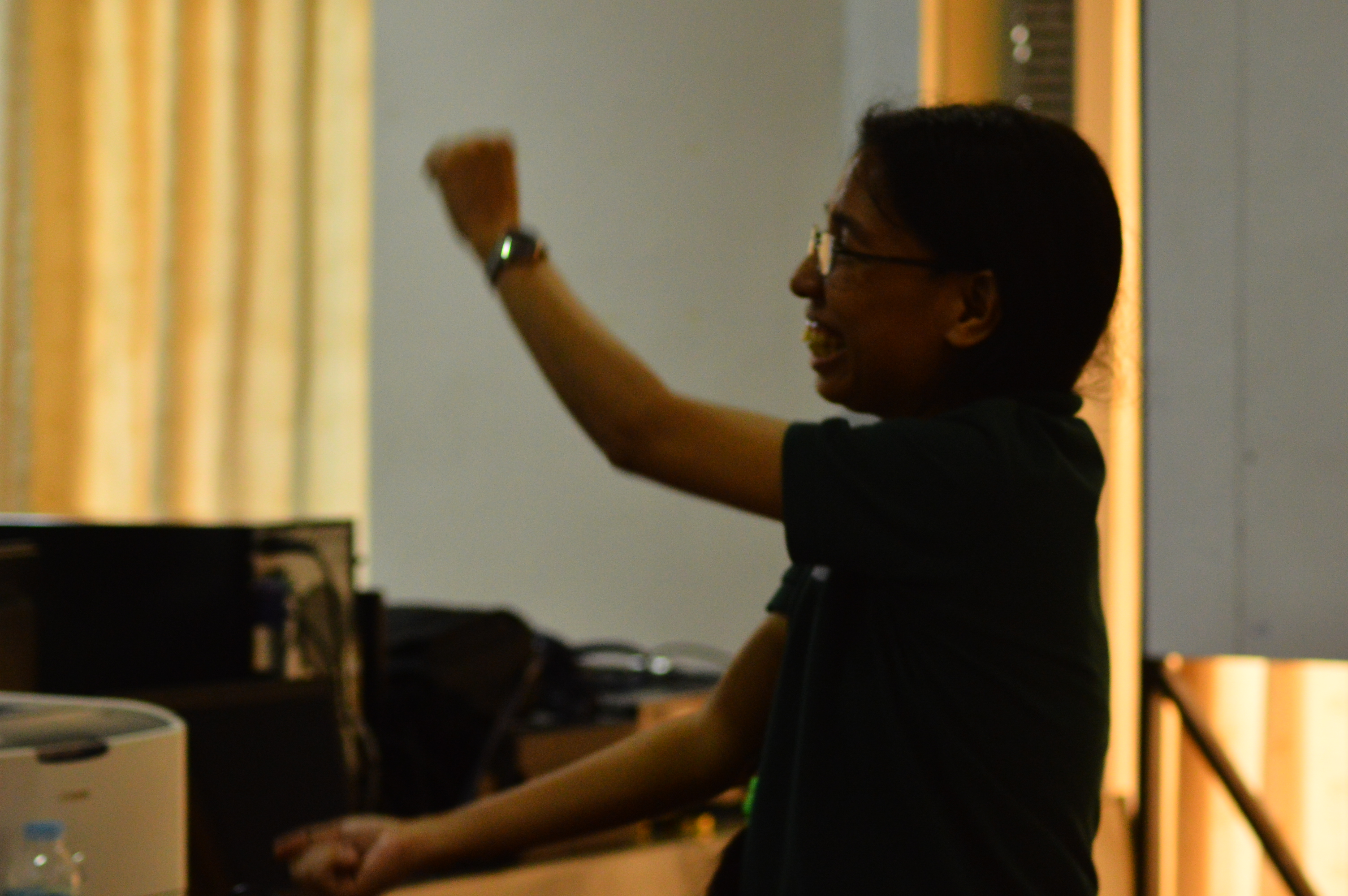
A speaker at the 10th Bikol Wikipedia anniversary in 2017 doing a "Baby Shark" dance

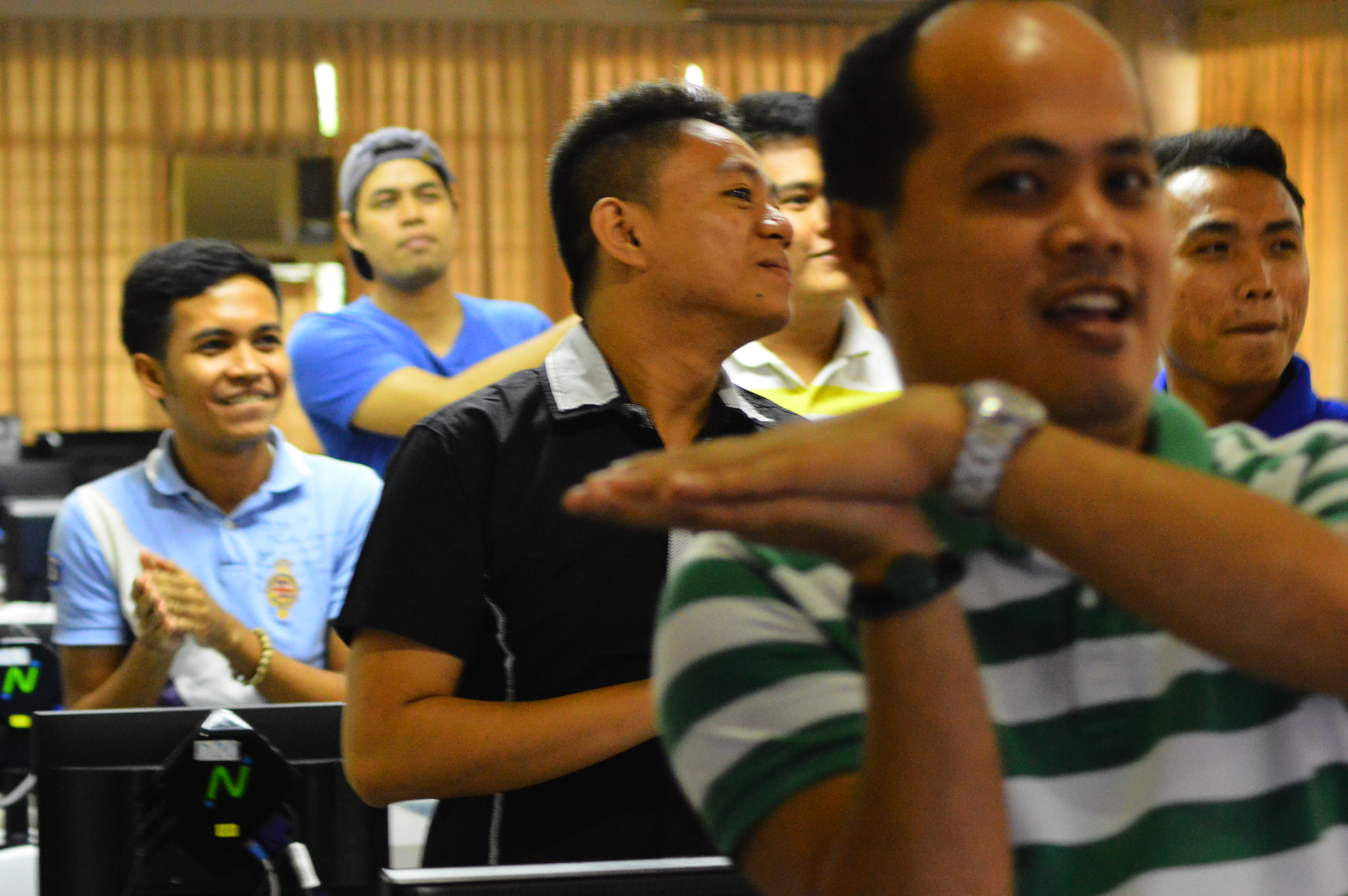
Baby Shark dancers at the 10th Bikol Wikipedia Anniversary ADNU

"Baby Shark Dance" is the most-viewed and third most-liked video on YouTube. Due to a 2013 change that the Billboard Hot 100 music charts made to account for online viewership of YouTube videos, "Baby Shark" broke into the Billboard Hot 100 at number 32 during the week of January 7, 2019.

Due to its popularity, this version of the song has spurred an online dance craze, which is sometimes referred to as the Baby Shark Challenge. It has been cited as "the next big thing after the domination of Gangnam Style". K-pop groups including Blackpink and Red Velvet have been credited with further spreading the viral song through their coverage of the song and dance, specifically on their featured TV shows and concerts. Other popular K-pop groups, both locally- and internationally known, have also sung and danced to the song in the original beat or in their own renditions that are shared on the internet, including Twice, Monsta X, Got7, and Mamamoo, among others. The song began to go viral in the Western world in August 2018.

In July 2019, Kellogg's announced it had entered a partnership with Pinkfong to introduce a Baby Shark cereal, a berry-flavored variant of Froot Loops with marshmallows added. It was first available at Sam's Club on August 17, and at Walmart in late September. In March 2020, Pinkfong released a new interactive version of the song that encourages children to properly wash their hands during the COVID-19 pandemic.

In December 2020, SmartStudy partnered with US cable network Nickelodeon to premiere Baby Shark's Big Show!, an animated television series that aimed at preschoolers that was adapted from Baby Shark.

In 2024, LG launched the Baby Shark World for Kids app on LG Smart TVs in 184 countries. As of 5 April 2024, the app is ranked at number 67 on the list of highest grossing education apps in South Korea. On August 20, 2026, Geonroung Park, also known as BabyShark Boy, made his debut "Wave" featuring Joohoney of Monsta X. He was known as the boy in the original video in 2016, and parts of the original music video was used for his debut music video.

=== Wright v SmartStudy ===
Wright's English version lists the members of the shark family; Pinkfong's version says Mommy Shark is "pretty", Daddy Shark is "strong", Grandma Shark is "kind", and Grandpa Shark is "cool". In January 2018, the South Korean newspaper Kyunghyang Shinmun published a front-page editorial condemning these lyrics as sexist.

In May 2018, the Liberty Korea Party started using "Baby Shark" to promote its candidates, prompting SmartStudy to threaten legal action over copyright infringement. Prior to this, the Liberty Korea Party had contacted Wright for permission, who responded that the song was in the public domain. He has stated that when he uploaded his YouTube video in 2011, he did not believe his version could be protected under copyright law. Wright's version is not the oldest, nor the only non-violent rendition of the folk song.

Eventually, Wright filed his own copyright infringement suit against SmartStudy in South Korea, with the first hearing taking place in July 2019. On July 23, 2021, the Seoul Central District Court ruled that SmartStudy did not infringe on Wright's rights. The ruling cited the Korea Copyright Commission judgement that Wright's version added an instrument to an existing folk song. SmartStudy did not secure ownership either, with the court ruling that the Pinkfong version was based on oral tradition and not under copyright. The case received a write-up in a South Korean law journal in November 2021. Wright took the case to the Supreme Court of South Korea, which dismissed the case in August 2025.

== In media ==
In October 2019, a 75-minute stage musical based on the Pinkfong song and characters, titled Baby Shark Live, made its debut at Spartanburg Memorial Auditorium in Spartanburg, South Carolina. By this time, Pinkfong was also marketing a wide variety of merchandise based on their song and video, including clothing, bedding, toys and fishing tackle.

In 2019 and 2020, the song was featured in the films The Angry Birds Movie 2 and Rubber and as a playable song in the video game Just Dance 2020.

In November 2019, a children's book based on the Pinkfong characters was being marketed by HarperCollins, while five unlicensed children's books offered by Scholastic Corporation had sold over one million copies. In 2020, Pinkfong partnered with Bushiroad to include "Baby Shark" as a playable track in the English server of BanG Dream! Girls Band Party! from March 27 to April 17.

In June 2020, Pinkfong announced the television series Baby Shark's Big Show!, which premiered on Educational Broadcasting System (EBS) in South Korea. The show premiered on Nickelodeon in the United States in December 2020. On July 20, 2021, the series was renewed for a second season, and a feature film based on the series was released on December 8, 2023.

In the American comedy-drama television series Ted Lasso, fictional association football player Jamie Tartt uses the tune of the song as his goal celebration anthem, in which the words "Baby Shark" are replaced with his name.

In April 2024, Pinkfong announced its limited-time collaboration with the game company Supercell to incorporate Baby Shark into the company's mobile game Brawl Stars. On April 1, a Baby Shark-themed in-game skin was introduced in the game. The Brawler El Primo adopted the Baby Shark skin. Additionally, the song played nonstop while players were playing, and a Baby Shark pin was awarded to those who succeeded in the Baby Shark challenges.

The fourth season of The Umbrella Academy released in August 2024 features long excerpts of the song in several episodes.

=== In sports ===
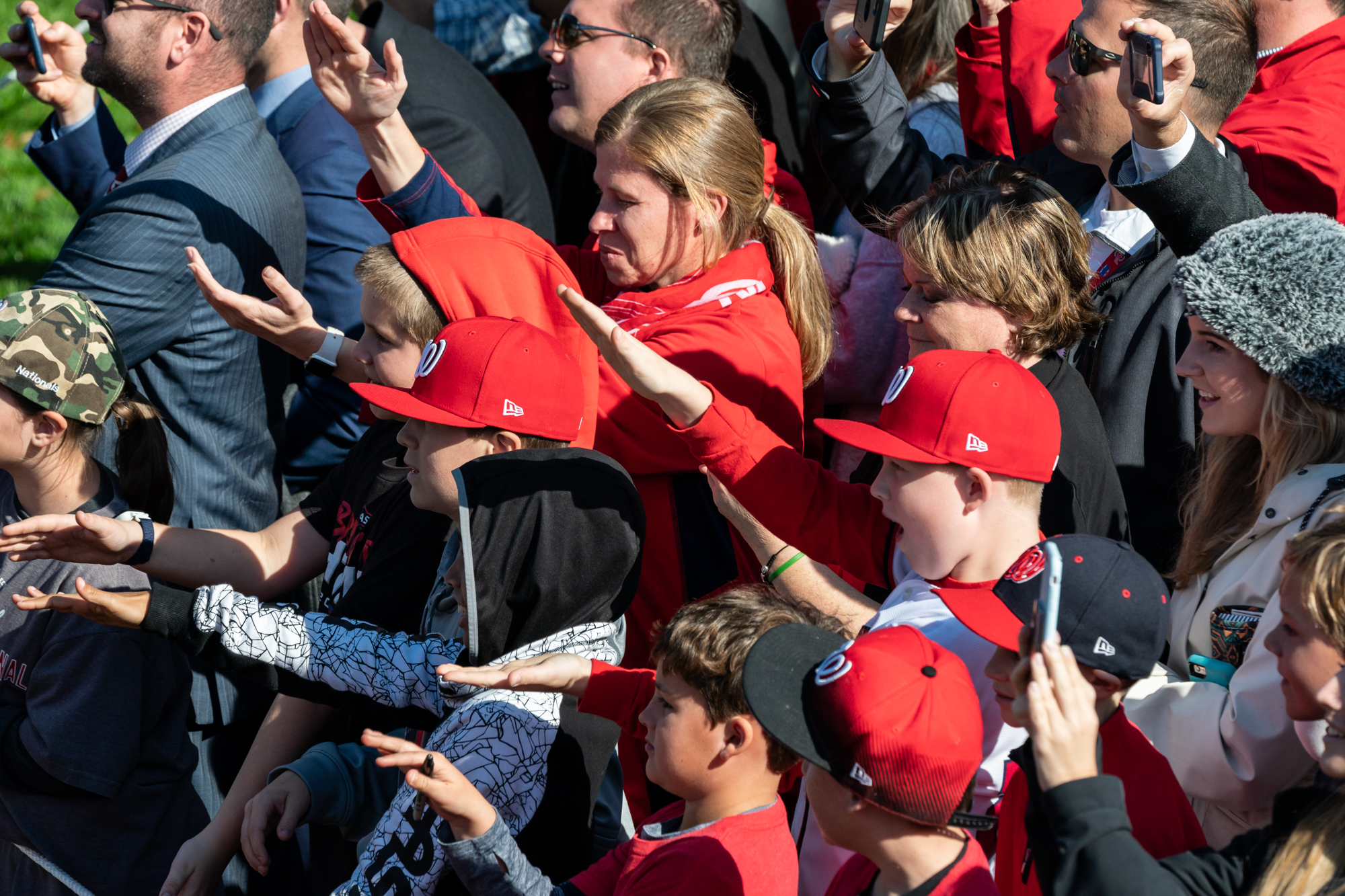
Invited guests and White House staff members make a "Baby Shark" gesture as they welcome to the White House the 2019 World Series Champion, the Washington Nationals, on Monday, November 4, 2019.

Professional baseball player Gerardo Parra of the Washington Nationals, having discovered the song through his young daughter, adopted it as his walk-up music to energize the flagging team on June 19, 2019. The theme became popular among both teammates and fans, who used the shark clap whenever the Nationals got a hit, and eventually, at every Parra at-bat; fans also began wearing shark costumes to the stadium. A stuffed baby shark was seen attached to the dugout railing during the 2019 National League Championship Series, which the Nationals won over the St. Louis Cardinals. During the 2019 World Series between the Washington Nationals and the Houston Astros, the song was the subject of a singing bet between the Choral Arts Society of Washington and the Houston Chamber Choir, with the condition that the Houston Chamber Choir would sing Baby Shark if the Washington Nationals won the World Series and the Choral Arts Society would sing Deep in the Heart of Texas vice versa. After the Houston Astros lost the World Series in seven games, the Houston Chamber Choir honored its promise by singing Baby Shark in its rendition and posting the video on its YouTube official account. The Choral Arts Society, though winning the bet, returned the honor by performing live on TV a mashup rendition of Baby Shark and Deep in the Heart of Texas. The craze of Baby Shark among Washington Nationals' fans culminated after the team's win; the connection was such that the Marine Band performed the song during the team's celebratory visit to the White House. The song is now played in the middle of the 8th inning in honor of their first title.

Darts player Mikuru Suzuki has used the song as her entrance music.

=== In promotions ===
On May 23, 2022, it was reported that a promotional video for Singapore's tourism sector in the form of a collaboration between Pinkfong and the Singapore Tourism Board was made and uploaded on YouTube. The video featured characters from Baby Shark and the Merli, a Singaporean mascot.

During the months of April and May of 2022, Shopee aired advertisement in Poland and Singapore which used the melody of Baby Shark but with modified lyrics. Many Poles considered the advertisements annoying due to a high incidence of broadcasting across television and radio. Two years earlier, in November 2020, it had been used for similar advertising purposes in Brazil. In Southeast Asia, the song was used with different versions and renditions; it was first spotted in 2018, with Filipina actress Anne Curtis as an endorser. More recently, the jingle to the tune of "Baby Shark" was used when Jackie Chan became the international brand ambassador.

=== In politics ===
The song has also been performed by anti-government protesters in Lebanon during the 2019–20 Lebanese protests.

In July 2019, officials in West Palm Beach, Florida were criticized for playing a continuous loop of "Baby Shark", alongside "Raining Tacos" throughout the night outside the Waterfront Lake Pavilion as a way of deterring vagrants.

=== Criminal charges for use ===
In October 2020, two former detention officers and a supervisor at an Oklahoma County jail were charged with counts of misdemeanor cruelty to a prisoner and conspiracy for forcing inmates to listen to the song on a loop at loud volumes while standing and handcuffed for an extended period. The detention officers pleaded guilty and were placed on probation; the charges against the supervisor were dismissed.

=== Other versions ===
In September 2018, Ellen DeGeneres released her version of the song on The Ellen DeGeneres Show.

There have been multiple singers who have sung their versions on The Late Late Show with James Corden. In 2018, James Corden invited Sophie Turner and Josh Groban to the show to perform the song, with Corden singing the baby shark chorus, Turner singing mommy shark, and Groban singing daddy shark. In 2019, in her Carpool Karaoke episode, Celine Dion sang the song briefly after being asked by Corden to do so dramatically. Also on Carpool Karaoke, when asked if the members would sing rounds while they were bored, K-pop boyband BTS gave Baby Shark as an example and sang it on the spot, mixing the chorus with LMFAO's "Shots".

The song was performed on The X Factor in early December 2018 because it was requested by Simon Cowell's four-year-old son Eric. Yvie Oddly, a Drag queen and contestant on RuPaul's Drag Race, adapted the song for live lip-syncing performances, including a choreography that draws inspiration from voguing.

In February 2019, Bebe Rexha posted on her Twitter account (now X) a 40-second clip of her singing Baby Shark in an emotional manner.

Pinkfong collaborated with popular Australian children's music band The Wiggles for a Baby Shark performance collaboration featuring Pinkfong, Baby Shark, and The Wiggles. The collaboration resulted in a four-episode series premiering exclusively on YouTube, starting on December 18, 2023.

The Seoul-based high End audio label AudioGuy released a jazz version by the European Jazz Trio named "Baby Jazz Shark" in February 2020.

Pomplamoose released an electro funk version on April 1, 2021. In the 2021 reboot of Rugrats episode, "The Fish Stick", the babies' listen to "The Fishy Song", a parody of "Baby Shark".

== Charts ==
=== Weekly charts ===
Weekly chart performance for "Baby Shark"
Chart (2018–2022)	Peak position
Australia Streaming Audio Visual Tracks (ARIA)	40
Canada (Canadian Hot 100)	39
France (SNEP)	162
Global 200 (Billboard)	38
Ireland (IRMA)	22
New Zealand Hot Singles (RMNZ)	39
Scottish Singles Sales (Official Charts)	12
Sweden Heatseeker (Sverigetopplistan)	9
UK Singles (Official Charts)	6
US Billboard Hot 100	32
US Kid Digital Songs (Billboard)	1
US Rolling Stone Top 100	58
Vietnam (Vietnam Hot 100)	10

Chart performance for "Baby Shark" duet version
Chart (2019–2020)	Peak position
US Rolling Stone Top 100	73

=== Year-end charts ===
2019 year-end chart performance for "Baby Shark"
Chart (2019)	Position
Canada (Canadian Hot 100)	85
UK Singles (OCC)	48
US Billboard Hot 100	75

2020 year-end chart performance for "Baby Shark"
Chart (2020)	Position
UK Singles (OCC)	72

2021 year-end chart performance for "Baby Shark"
Chart (2021)	Position
Global 200 (Billboard)	48
UK Singles (OCC)	73

2022 year-end chart performance for "Baby Shark"
Chart (2022)	Position
Global 200 (Billboard)	52

2023 year-end chart performance for "Baby Shark"
Chart (2023)	Position
Global 200 (Billboard)	89

2024 year-end chart performance for "Baby Shark"
Chart (2024)	Position
Global 200 (Billboard)	147

== Certifications ==
Certifications for "Baby Shark"
Region	Certification	Certified units/sales
Brazil (Pro-Música Brasil) Luis Fonsi Version	Platinum	40,000^{‡}
Denmark (IFPI Danmark)	Gold	45,000^{‡}
France (SNEP)	Platinum	200,000^{‡}
Italy (FIMI)	2× Platinum	200,000^{‡}
New Zealand (RMNZ)	3× Platinum	90,000^{‡}
Poland (ZPAV)	2× Platinum	100,000^{‡}
Spain (Promusicae)	Platinum	60,000^{‡}
United Kingdom (BPI)	5× Platinum	3,000,000^{‡}
United States (RIAA)	11× Platinum	11,000,000^{‡}
^{‡} Sales+streaming figures based on certification alone.

== See also ==
- List of viral music videos
- List of most-viewed YouTube videos
- List of most-liked YouTube videos
