= Andrew Wave =

Latvian influencer (born 1998)

Andrejs Černuckis
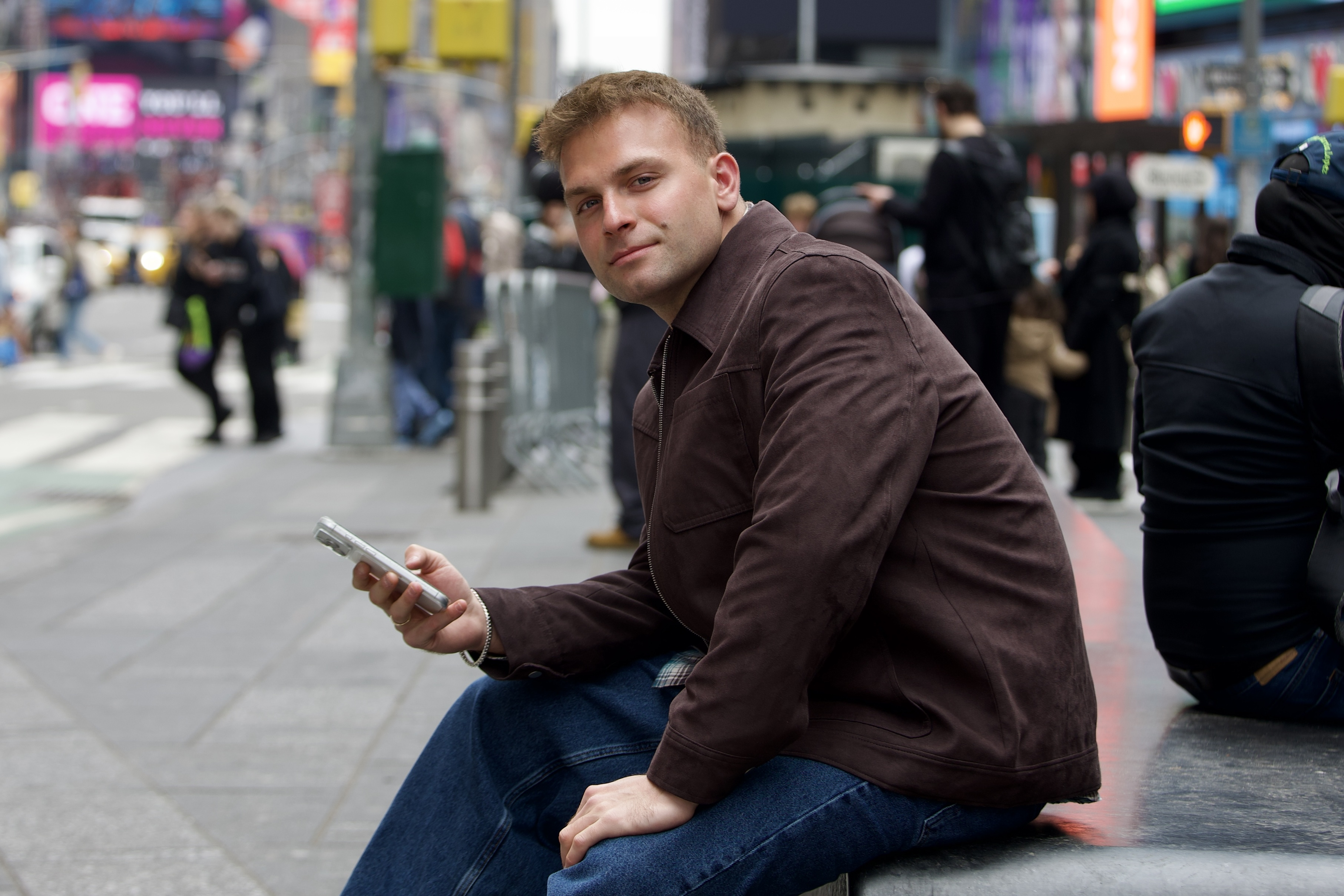
- Picture of Andrew Wave in New York
- Born: Andrejs Černuckis; 3 March 1998 (age 28); Riga, Latvia
- Other names: RedCarpetBoy; Andrejko Epta
- Occupations: TikToker/Instagrammer; Entertainer

Instagram information
- Page: Andrew Wave
- Years active: 12
- Genre: Entertainment
- Followers: 5.99 million

TikTok information
- Page: andrew_wave
- Genre: Entertainment
- Followers: 10.9 million

YouTube information
- Channel: andrew_wave
- Genre: Entertainment
- Subscribers: 11.7 million @andr3w_wave
- Views: 9 billon @andr3w_wave
- Last updated: 20 May 2026

Andrew Wave (born Andrejs Černuckis, and also known as Andrejs Epta) is a Latvian content creator, social experimenter, and influencer recognized for his creative video content.

== Career and content style ==
Černuckis began creating short videos and social experiments in 2019 on the streets of Riga, Latvia. While he initially focused on a local audience, he quickly shifted his strategy to target an international viewership, a move that led to exponential growth. Černuckis has publicly acknowledged the financial difficulties he faced at the beginning of his career, stating that he had to subsist on inexpensive instant noodles for half a year before his career took off.

His content includes surprising a woman on public transport by preparing a traditional Midsummer meal.

== Awards ==
Černuckis has received YouTube's Diamond Play Button for surpassing 10 million subscribers on the platform.

- Silver Button — March 6, 2024
- Golden Button — May 12, 2024
- Diamond Button — June 12, 2025
