= LaBrant family =

American family YouTubers and influencers

The LaBrant Fam
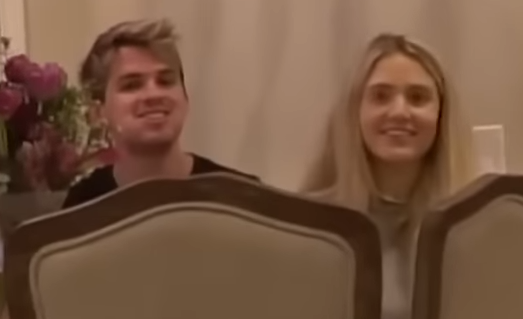
- Cole (left) and Savannah (right) LaBrant in 2019
- Born: Cole LaBrant; August 21, 1996 (age 30); Alabama, U.S.; Savannah Soutas; March 2, 1993 (age 33); California, U.S.

YouTube information
- Channel: The LaBrant Fam
- Years active: 2016–present
- Genres: Vlog; family; prank; challenge
- Subscribers: 12.7 million
- Views: 4.7 billion
- Last updated: March 17, 2026

The LaBrant family, known online as the LaBrant Fam (previously as Cole and Sav or Cole&Sav), is an American family of vloggers and influencers, consisting of parents Cole LaBrant (born August 21, 1996) and Savannah LaBrant (née Soutas; born March 2, 1993) and their five children: Everleigh LaBrant, Posie LaBrant, Zealand LaBrant, Sunday LaBrant, and Beckham LaBrant. As of 2025, their YouTube channel has more than 12 million subscribers; they also have large followings on Instagram and TikTok.

While in high school, Cole rose to fame on Vine as one-third of the Troy, Alabama–based twerking trio Dem White Boyz, and later gained attention for his promposal video addressed to Selena Gomez in 2015. Everleigh, Savannah's daughter from a previous relationship, became popular online at two years old on Instagram, YouTube, and Musical.ly, and was one of the highest-earning child influencers on Instagram by 2020. Savannah and Cole began dating in 2016, the same year they launched their family YouTube channel, and got married the following year. In addition to posting vlogs and dance videos, their channel also focuses heavily on their Christianity. Their memoir, Cole & Sav: Our Surprising Love Story, was published in 2018.

The LaBrant family have been the subject of numerous controversies on YouTube, including accusations of having staged a wildfire evacuation in a 2018 video; a 2019 video in which they prank Everleigh by telling her they are giving away her puppy; a 2022 video whose title was maligned as clickbait that misled viewers to believe Posie had been diagnosed with cancer; and their 2022 anti-abortion documentary Abortion in 2022, which sparked backlash online for its comparisons of abortion in the United States to the Holocaust.

== Early lives and careers ==
=== Cole LaBrant ===
Cole Richard LaBrant was born on August 21, 1996 in Alabama to Sheri, from Stone Mountain, Georgia, and Ken, a Spanish professor at Troy University, and raised in a Christian household in Troy, Alabama. He has four brothers—including an older brother, Luke, and a younger brother, Jack—and one sister, Lily. Cole has stated that, in 2010, when he was 13 years old, Tripp Dennis Freeman, a scorekeeper from Troy who was 19 years old, whispered sexual questions in his ear after a Relay for Life event. After Cole's family brought his accusations to the police, a total of 17 alleged victims of Freeman's child sexual misconduct came forward with similar accusations and, in 2012, he was sentenced to 65 years in prison.

Cole formed the Vine trio Dem White Boyz with his friends Baylor Barnes and John Stephen Grice in July 2013. They became popular online, particularly among teenage girls, for their twerking videos, which were initially made to mock women making similar videos. By 2013, they had 1.3 million followers on Vine, which rose to four million in 2014 and five and a half million in 2015. They were featured in an internet fame–focused series for New York in April 2014. His 2015 YouTube promposal to Selena Gomez went viral online and received more than one million views, though she did not respond to the video. Cole's was the 15th most-followed account on Vine in 2015, with more than six million followers. He graduated from Enterprise High School in 2015 and began attending Troy University as a business major, though he later dropped out after moving to California to live with Savannah. He competed alongside his mother on the 28th season of The Amazing Race, which featured a cast of social media personalities and premiered in February 2016. They placed second.

=== Savannah LaBrant ===
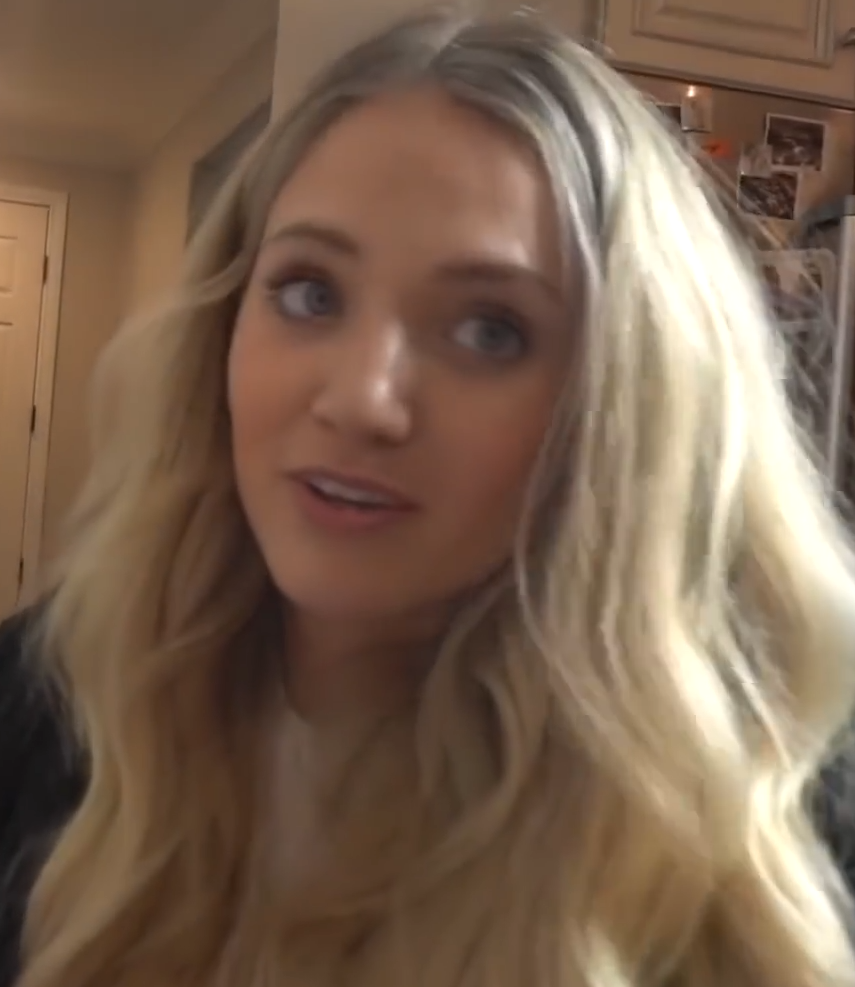
Savannah LaBrant in 2019

Savannah was born, Savannah Rose Soutas, on March 2, 1993. Her father worked as an insurance salesman and her sister, Chantelle Paige, is an influencer and former singer. Her family moved from San Jose, California to Dana Point while she was in middle school, and her parents divorced while she was in high school after her mother found out about an affair that her father was having. She attended Saddleback College for two years before transferring to California State University, Long Beach, where she majored in teaching. While in college in 2012, she had a daughter, Everleigh Rose Soutas, with her then–boyfriend Tommy Smith. The two broke up after, according to her, he cheated on her multiple times. Smith died in September 2022 at age 29 from an accidental fentanyl overdose.

At the recommendation of her mother, GiGi, Soutas and her friend Michelle Foley started ForEverAndForAva, an Instagram fashion blog focused on Everleigh and Ava Foley, Michelle's daughter, both of whom were 10 months old at the time. By 2015, the account had more than 85 thousand followers and was the focus of a BuzzFeed article. The girls had also modeled for Guess and the Kardashian Kids Collection. Foley started the ForEverAndForAva YouTube channel in 2015, which focused on toy unboxing and dance videos and had amassed one million subscribers by late 2018. Savannah also gained popularity on Musical.ly for videos she filmed with Everleigh.

== Lives and careers ==
Cole and Savannah met at The Grove shopping complex in Los Angeles and began dating in 2016—the same year they started Cole&Sav, a joint YouTube vlogging channel—and got married in July 2017. Cole soon tweeted about the consummation of their marriage, writing that he was "no longer a virgin" with the hashtag "#MarriageRocks", which received mixed reactions from users online. The couple signed with Creative Artists Agency in 2017.

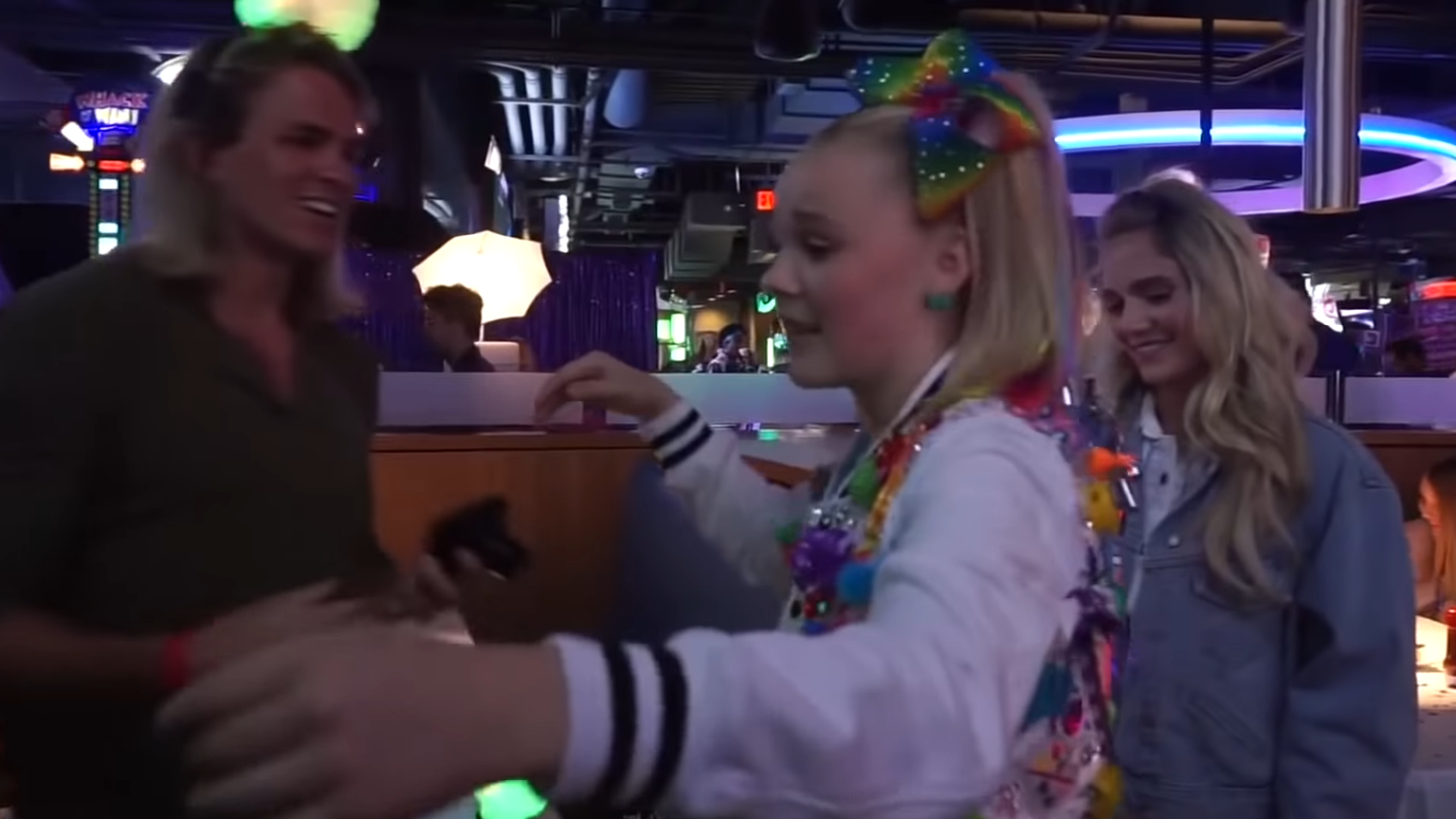
Cole (left) and Savannah (right) with JoJo Siwa at her 15th birthday party in 2018

By 2018, the Cole&Sav YouTube channel, which also prominently featured Everleigh, had more than six and a half million subscribers. Their videos, which include pranks and food challenges, became known for discussing their conservative Christian values on the channel, including their belief in abstaining from premarital sex. In August 2018, they posted a vlog titled "A Giant Fire Makes Us Evacuate Our House", with a thumbnail of their faces superimposed over a burning forest. It follows them ostensibly having to evacuate their home in Ladera Ranch, California during the 2018 Holy Fire in Southern California and traveling to San Francisco. Ladera Ranch, however, was not one of the areas evacuated during the fire, and their neighbors publicly accused them of having misled viewers in the video, which sparked backlash against them online. They soon changed the thumbnail and title of the video, though they did not publicly address the controversy. They wrote Cole and Sav: A Surprising Love Story, a joint memoir about their relationship and lives, which was released in October 2018.

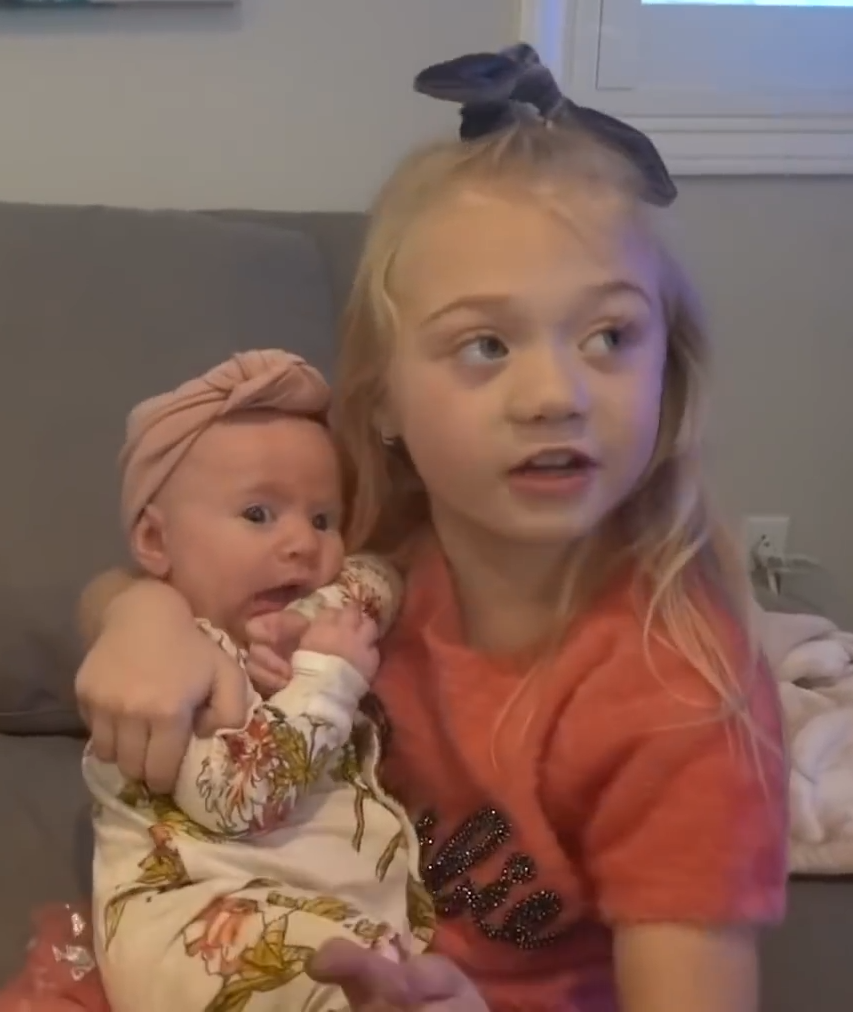
Everleigh (right) holding Posie (left) in 2018

The couple's first child together, Posie Rayne LaBrant, was born in December 2018. By 2019, their YouTube channel, which was renamed to The LaBrant Fam, had more than nine million subscribers. On April Fools' Day in 2019, they posted a video titled "We Have to Give Our Puppy Away ... Saying Goodbye Forever". In it, they convince then–six-year-old Everleigh that they are giving away the family's puppy, Carl, as she sits in silence before they reveal that it was a prank, causing her to burst into tears. The video was widely criticized by social media users as overly cruel and potentially traumatic for Everleigh, with Ashley Reese of Jezebel writing that it was "deeply fucked up". In a follow-up video posted two days later, the couple defended the prank and their parenting of Everleigh but stated that they regretted uploading the video, with Savannah apologizing to those who "think we're such bad people for making the video". In May 2019, Cole faced backlash on Twitter, including from Martin Luther King Jr.'s daughter Bernice King, after tweeting a video of his adopted black cousin Truman LaBrant, whom he referred to as "Peanut", getting on his hands and knees for a white girl to step on top of him to get on a swing. By 2020, Everleigh, then seven years old, had more than five million Instagram followers and was listed by the South China Morning Post as the highest-earning Instagram influencer under 10 years old. Zealand Cole LaBrant, the couple's second child and first son, was born in 2020. In September 2021, the couple uploaded a video titled "She Got Diagnosed with Cancer. (Documentary)", in which they talk about Posie having to go to the emergency room before transitioning into discussing an unrelated child with cancer. The video was criticized online by fans as clickbait for convincing viewers that their daughter had been diagnosed with cancer. Cole later apologized for the misleading title on his Instagram Stories.

By 2022, the LaBrants' YouTube channel had more than 13 million subscribers. The couple made the anti-abortion documentary short Abortion, which they uploaded to their YouTube channel in April 2022. It was made in collaboration with the non-profit organization Live Action and features interviews with anti-abortion doctors Anthony Levatino and Kathi Aultman, who give graphic descriptions of the abortion process; Savannah, who describes her experience with getting pregnant at age 19; two mothers whose pregnancies were unplanned and worked with a church support group called Embrace Grace; and Cole's grandmother, whose mother put her up for adoption four months after giving birth to her. The documentary also makes the unverified claim that abortion in the United States is a "more deadly killer" than cardiovascular disease and compares an unsourced statistic of 61 million abortions performed in the United States over an unspecified period of time to the death tolls of the Cambodian genocide, the Rwandan genocide, and the Holocaust. The LaBrants received widespread backlash on social media for the documentary and its claims, including from obstetrician-gynecologist Danielle Jones, influencer Tana Mongeau, YouTuber Jaclyn Glenn, and the advocacy group StopAntisemitism. According to Cole, YouTube soon demonetized the video and Instagram removed posts on Cole's account pertaining to the documentary. Both Cole and Savannah deactivated their Twitter accounts soon after. Jenna Amatulli of the feminist website Jezebel criticized the documentary as "blatant, false ... anti-Semitic, misogynistic propaganda". Conversely, Bailey Durian of the conservative magazine The Federalist praised the documentary as "beautiful" and criticized YouTube and Instagram's actions as "appalling" and "unconstitutional censorship" from "Big Tech".

The couple's third child together, a daughter named Sunday Savannah LaBrant, was born in June 2022. Also in 2022, they purchased and moved into a $4.5 million mansion in Nashville, Tennessee, which they listed for $5.4 million in October 2024 before taking it off the market the following month. Everleigh released a song, "Like Taylor Swift", in September 2023 with a music video. The song was widely mocked on TikTok for its lyrical references to Taylor Swift song titles. Users compared it to Rebecca Black's similarly derided 2011 song "Friday". JoJo Siwa, who had previously appeared in the LaBrant family's videos, defended Everleigh and criticized "anyone that's been saying negative things about this song". Beckham Blue LaBrant, the couple's fourth child and second son together, was born in May 2024. As of 2024, their children are homeschooled. By 2024, the family had also garnered a significant following on their TikTok account, initially for dance videos featuring Everleigh with either Cole or Savannah and later for more family-focused content. A video of Cole and Everleigh dancing to Diddy and Faith Evans' 1997 song "I'll Be Missing You", which was posted on their Instagram and TikTok accounts in September 2024, faced backlash online due to being posted days after Diddy was arrested in New York City on charges of racketeering conspiracy, sex trafficking, and transportation to engage in prostitution. They deleted the video soon after. Also in 2024, Cole began posting videos of Posie and Zealand singing worship songs, including Hillsong Worship's "Who You Say I Am" and Phil Wickham's "Living Hope", to Instagram. Cole endorsed Donald Trump in the 2024 presidential election on Instagram, writing a week before the election that there needed to be "more of God for our country, not less". In November 2024, Cole adopted Everleigh following her father's death two years prior.

In April, 2026, the family placed their Tennessee home on the market again.
