= Kids Diana Show =

YouTuber (born 2014)

- Born: Eva Diana Kidisyuk; March 31, 2014 (age 12); Kyiv, Ukraine
- Occupation: Vlogger
- Parents: Volodymyr Kidysyuk (father); Olena Kidisyuk (mother)
- Relatives: Roma Kidisyuk

YouTube information
- Channel: Kids Diana Show
- Years active: 2015–present
- Genres: Toy unboxing; vlogs
- Subscribers: 138.95 million
- Views: 126.6 billion
- Last updated: Nov 6, 2026

Eva Diana Kidisyuk (Note: Ukrainian: Єва Діана Кідисюк, romanized: Yeva Diana Kidysiuk) (born March 31, 2014), known online as Kids Diana Show (stylized as ✿ Kids Diana Show), is a YouTuber. Together with her brother Roma (born October 22, 2012) and parents Volodymyr and Olena, she hosts several YouTube channels producing roleplay-oriented content. As of March 2026, her main channel was the 5th most-viewed and 6th most-subscribed in the world.

== Content ==
Diana's content includes unboxings, vlogging, educational entertainment, and roleplays. Her older brother, Roma Kidisyuk, runs a YouTube channel entitled Kids Roma Show (stylized as ★ Kids Roma Show). She also has 2 younger brothers, Oliver Kidisyuk (born December 22, 2020) and Adam Kidisyuk (born February 6, 2023). Her family's channels are dubbed into many languages, including Chinese, Hindi, Japanese, Indonesian, Russian, Spanish, German, Portuguese, and Arabic.

Diana was nominated for the 2020 10th annual Streamy Awards in the Parents and Family category and the 2021 Shorty Awards in the Parents and Family category.

== History ==
Olena and Volodymyr Kydysiuk started making YouTube videos as a hobby when Diana's brother, Roma, was born. Born in Kyiv, Ukraine, Diana first appeared in a video in 2015 when Olena launched a YouTube channel to share videos of Diana with friends and family. In 2017, both parents left their jobs to focus full-time on their YouTube channel. The family later relocated to Miami, Florida, where they stayed for a year before relocating again to Dubai, United Arab Emirates.

In May 2020, Diana’s parents signed a deal with Pocket.Watch, a startup children's media company founded in 2016 by Chris Williams and Albie Hecht. It has spearheaded Love, Diana — The Princess Of Play, a franchise based around their brand including an animated series, mobile game, and merchandise based on their channel's brands.

Love, Diana is a live-action animated series consisting of short stories set in the fictional "Land of Play" that follows Diana and Roma as they protect friends and family from characters symbolizing demonized boredom. The show is distributed on YouTube and OTT services like Amazon Prime Video, The Roku Channel, Hulu, and Samsung TV+.

Main channels' statistics (6 Nov 2026)
Channel	Subscribers, millions	Views, billions	YouTube Creator Awards				
Channel	Subscribers, millions	Views, billions	YouTube Creator Awards	YouTube Creator Awards	YouTube Creator Awards	YouTube Creator Awards	YouTube Creator Awards
Channel	Subscribers, millions	Views, billions	0.1	1	10	50	100
Kids Diana Show	138.95	126.6	2016	2016	2018	2020	2022
Diana and Roma ARA	30.9	15.1	2019	2019	2020		
Diana and Roma ESP	41.2	18.96	2019	2019	2020		
Diana and Roma EN	30	11.5	2017	2017	2020		
Kids Roma Show	45.8	23.3	2016	2017	2019		
Diana and Roma HIN	29.6	14.4	2019	2019	2020		
Диана и Рома на русском	10.4	4.5	2019	2020	2025		
Diana and Roma JPN	4.62	2.3	2019	2020			
Diana and Roma VNM	19.4	8.5	2019	2020	2023		
Love, Diana	11.2	4.5	2019	2020	2024		
Diana and Roma PRT	13.6	6.2	2019	2019	2022		
Diana and Roma IND	18.7	9.5	2019	2020	2022		
Diana and Roma IND Collection	3.01	1.6	2019	2019			

== Awards and nominations ==
Year	Award	Category	Result	Ref.
2022	Kids' Choice Awards	Best Female Creator	Nominated	
