= Mac n' Cheetos =

Fast food product

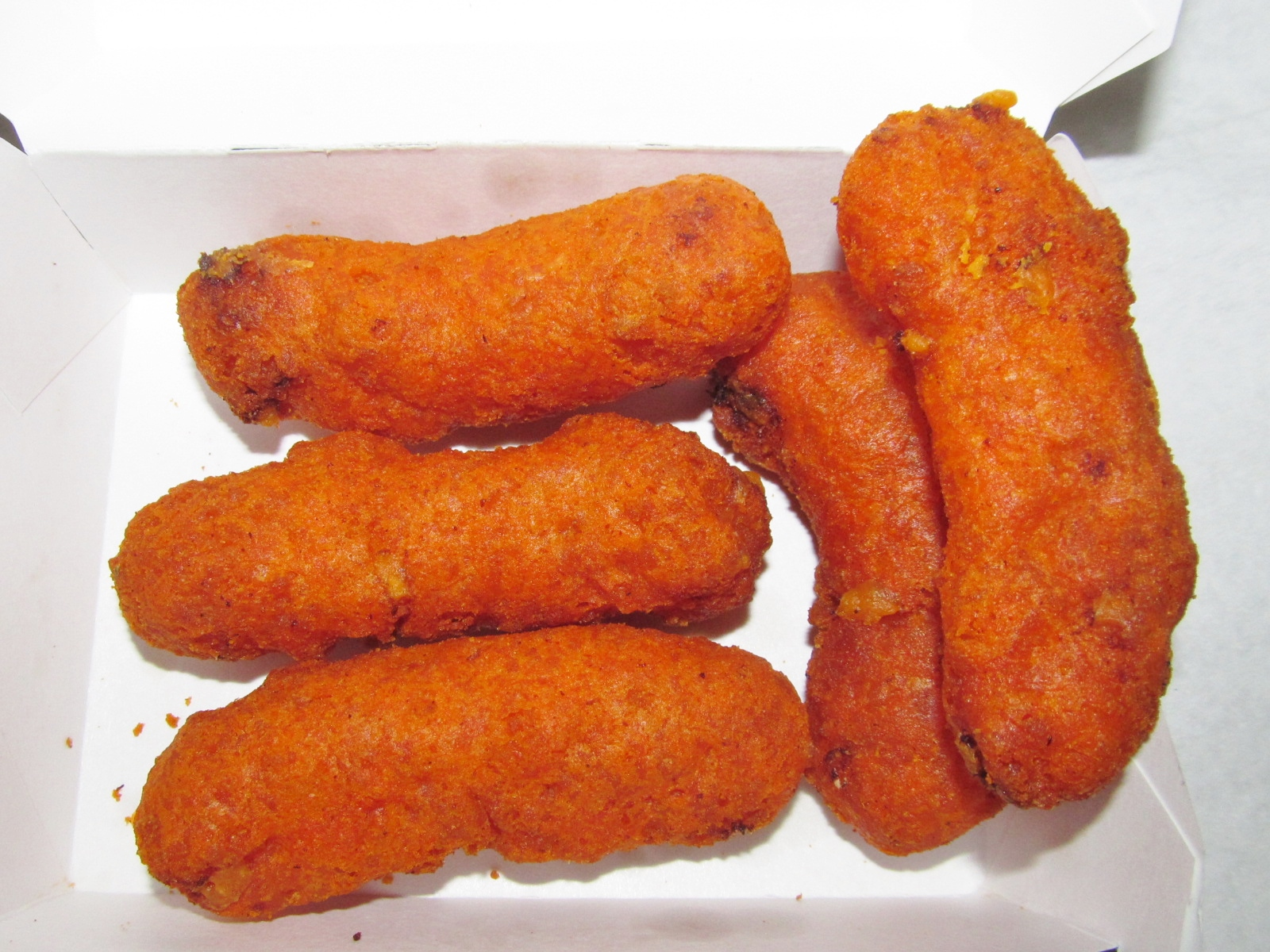

Nutritional value per 5 pieces (115 g)
- Energy: 310 kcal (1,300 kJ)
- Carbohydrates: 37 g
- Sugars: 9 g
- Dietary fiber: 2 g
- Fat: 13 g
- Saturated: 4.5 g
- Trans: 0 g
- Protein: 9 g
Vitamins and minerals
Vitamins	Quantity %DV^{†}
Vitamin A	0 IU
Vitamin C	0% 0 mg
Minerals	Quantity %DV^{†}
Calcium	0% 0 mg
Iron	0% 0 mg
Sodium	31% 710 mg
- Other constituents: Quantity
- Energy from fat: 120 kcal (500 kJ)
- Cholesterol: 15 mg
- ^{†}Percentages estimated using US recommendations for adults. Source: Burger King

Mac n' Cheetos are a deep-fried macaroni and cheese product based on the Frito-Lay snack Cheetos. Mac n' Cheetos were introduced in late June 2016 and sold at Burger King in limited supplies. The original product contained five pieces and was served with a side of ranch dressing. Today, Mac n' Cheetos are available frozen at grocery stores around the United States.

Many publications have pointed out that Mac n' Cheetos is part of a larger trend of blending fast foods with well-known snack foods, as well as reflecting the current state of fast food alliances.

== Product description ==
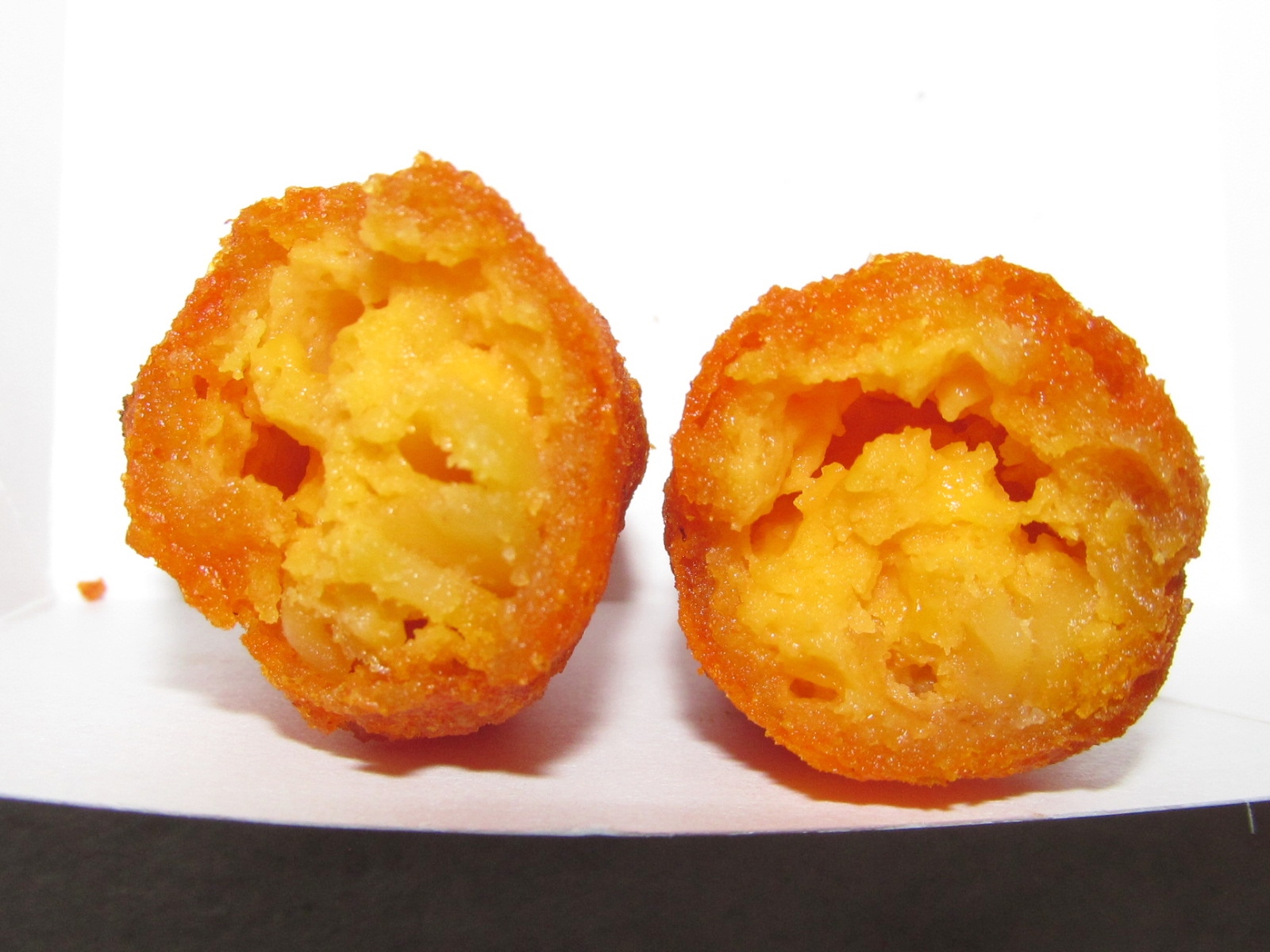
Cross section showing the macaroni filling

Mac n' Cheetos are fried macaroni and cheese bites shaped and coated to resemble Cheetos brand cheese curls. The fried shell of a curl is crunchy, and is flavored and colored like Cheetos. Burger King president Alex Macedo described the food item as a "triple threat", because it combines Burger King, Cheetos, and macaroni and cheese.

Mac n' Cheetos is a portmanteau of mac n' cheese and Cheetos.

Currently, there are two known varieties of Mac n' Cheetos: "Creamy Cheddar", and "Flamin' Hot".

== History ==
Fried macaroni and cheese had existed prior to the introduction of Mac n' Cheetos. The Cheesecake Factory and Wayback Burgers have sold similar products in the past.

Other fast food restaurants like Taco Bell have previously employed a similar strategy. In 2012, Taco Bell, which is owned by Yum! Brands, introduced the Doritos Locos Taco, whose taco shell is composed of the Doritos chip. Offshoots followed as Cool Ranch, Nacho Cheese, and Fiery Doritos. Consumerist's Laura Northrup compared them to 7-Eleven's Doritos Loaded and Hostess Brands's deep-fried Twinkies sold at participating Walmart locations.

In 2015, Burger King entered into a partnership with PepsiCo's Frito-Lay, which also owns the Doritos and Ruffles brands.

On June 22, 2016, Burger King announced that they would begin selling the product the next week. The product was test-marketed at Burger King restaurants during a product trial in Southern California. Mac n' Cheetos were introduced nationwide on June 27, 2016. In an interview, Burger King president Alex Macedo said, "We’re partnering up with one of Americans’ favorite brands. It's quite unique."

Later, Burger King offered Cheeto Chicken Fries, based on their BK Chicken Fries.

Mac n' Cheetos, including other Burger King products like the recently introduced Oscar Mayer hot dogs, reflects the fast-food alliances restaurants have with other companies. While PepsiCo owns Frito-Lay's Cheetos, the American restaurants sell Coca-Cola beverages. Despite this recent product, Macedo remarked, "It’s not a plan for us to migrate to Pepsi. Our relationship with Coke is as good as it is with PepsiCo." However, Macedo has also said, "We’re working on a few other menu items. There’s room for us to do more together in the future."

Mac n' Cheetos have also been sold at U.S. convenience store/gas station Sheetz stores in North Carolina and Ohio.

On May 18, 2017, Burger King returned the Mac n' Cheetos to its menu for a limited time. Frito-Lay also introduced a "Flamin' Hot Mac n' Cheetos" based on a spicier variant of Cheetos.

In response to fan interest following the popularity of the Burger King limited time releases, Frito-Lay released frozen Mac n' Cheetos in grocery stores.

== Reception ==
Fox News described them as "bright orange" with a "pretty unusual" shape. The Chicago Tribune's Joseph Hernandez called the color of the menu item "neon-orange". Consequence of Sound's Ben Kaye remarked that they were "new cat poop-shaped fried mac and Cheeto cheese curls". Consumerist's Ashlee Kieler perceived its color as "glowing, orange-ish". The Verge's Dami Lee commented that they were "coagulated orange clumps of processed cheese". Bloomberg News's Leslie Patton said it was "portable macaroni-and-cheese bites are similar to mozzarella sticks". Food & Wine's Mike Pomranz said "Like a car crash, this bizarre mashup is just too intense to ignore."

The Raw Story's Brad Reed saw it as "radioactive-orange" and "Trump-colored", but remarked "do look marginally more appetizing than the terrifying bright-red Whopper Burger King released earlier this year". Vice's Alex Swerdloff noted the product as "a chode-like mass" and resembling "the lovechild of E.T.’s finger and a bloated corpse that was given a spray tan". Yahoo! Style's Claire Lower called them "orange nuggets". The Denver Post's Megan McArdle reported it "bearing the same resemblance to real food as a plastic Lego tree does to a stately elm". The Guardian's Joshua David Stein said the Cheetos crust was "bright orange". The Capital Times's Rob Thomas said they were "five stubby cylinders that look like mozzarella sticks, dusted heavily with orange Cheeto dust".

Business Insider performed a blind taste test for Mac n' Cheetos. About half of the testers were repulsed by the product.

Fox News Channel's Chew On This enacted a blind taste test for Mac n' Cheetos in the streets of New York City. Reception proved positive. In the web series Juggalos Review Foods, two Insane Clown Posse fans (or Juggalos) tried the Mac n' Cheetos with a more mixed reception. One of the hosts appraised the food product with "this tastes like processed weird gross mac and cheese-like gimmicky piece of crap food item from Burger King".

USA Today's Ted Berg said "they’re not good" but also "not totally awful" either. Kotaku's Mike Fahey said "pleased to report that Mac n’ Cheetos taste much better than they look" but also that they do not taste like the cheese puff but rather like the Kellogg's cracker Cheez-It. Chicago Tribune's Joseph Hernandez described the meal as "gritty, fried nugget of Easy Mac, rolled in the remains of the bottom of a bag of Cheetos". Yahoo! Style's Claire Lower said "I liked them but, maybe this is because my standards for stunt food are much too high, I didn't love them." The Capital Times's Rob Thomas reviewed the interior of the Mac n' Cheetos favorably stating "does indeed have the satisfying cheesy blandness of a container of quick-zapped microwave Easy Mac, salty and starchy". However, Thomas was critical of how it did not taste like Cheetos saying "[i]t’s very disappointing".

When the menu item was brought back in October 2016 by Sheetz, Consumerist's Laura Northrup described them as "orange breaded carbohydrate globs." Fortune's Michal Addady called it "essentially fried mac and cheese coated with flavoring from Cheetos, a PepsiCo brand." Bustle's Claire Warner described Mac n' Cheetos returning via Sheetz as "the Internet basically threw a party."

When the food item returned to the Burger King menu on May 18, 2017, Eater.com's Amanda Kludt described it as "novelty dish and millennial-bait." Brit + Co's Maggie McCracken ranked Mac n' Cheetos #1 on the list "10 Most Popular Mac and Cheese #Cheatday Meals on Instagram" with "a WHOPping (get it?)" 35,000 likes on Instagram. Bustle's Claire Warner said "it sounds like what happens when you accidentally drop a glob of macaroni and cheese into a half-consumed bag of Cheetos resting on your lap, and a few hours later, you decide to eat said glob because it's 2 a.m. and nobody's watching. You already know if this is something you're into."

== Price ==
Mac n' Cheetos contains five pieces and was originally priced in Burger King at about $2.50 In New York City, the total cost including New York state sales tax is $3.26. USA Today's Ted Berg was critical of the price choice, as he thought it would be 99¢ at Taco Bell.

When the food item was brought back in October 2016 at Sheetz, it was priced at $2.99. Sheetz offers it available for pickup via the Sheetz Apps menu. However, it costs $3.49 in Altoona, Pennsylvania.

In May 2017, the Mac n' Cheetos was priced $2.69 at Burger King.

== Advertising ==
Burger King called its product a "dangerously cheesy re-imagination". In May 2017, a press release described them as "cheesiest, most amplified version of mac n’ cheese imaginable."

In June 2016, a commercial featuring Chester Cheetah unboxing the Mac n' Cheetos debuted.

In May 2017, David Miami created a music video starring The Burger King and Chester Cheetah dancing to the Mark Morrison R&B song "Return of the Mack", remade as "Return of the Mac n' Cheetos".

== See also ==
- Burger King products
- Double Down (sandwich)
- McRib
- Mozzarella sticks
