= Like Nastya =

Russian-American YouTuber (born 2014)

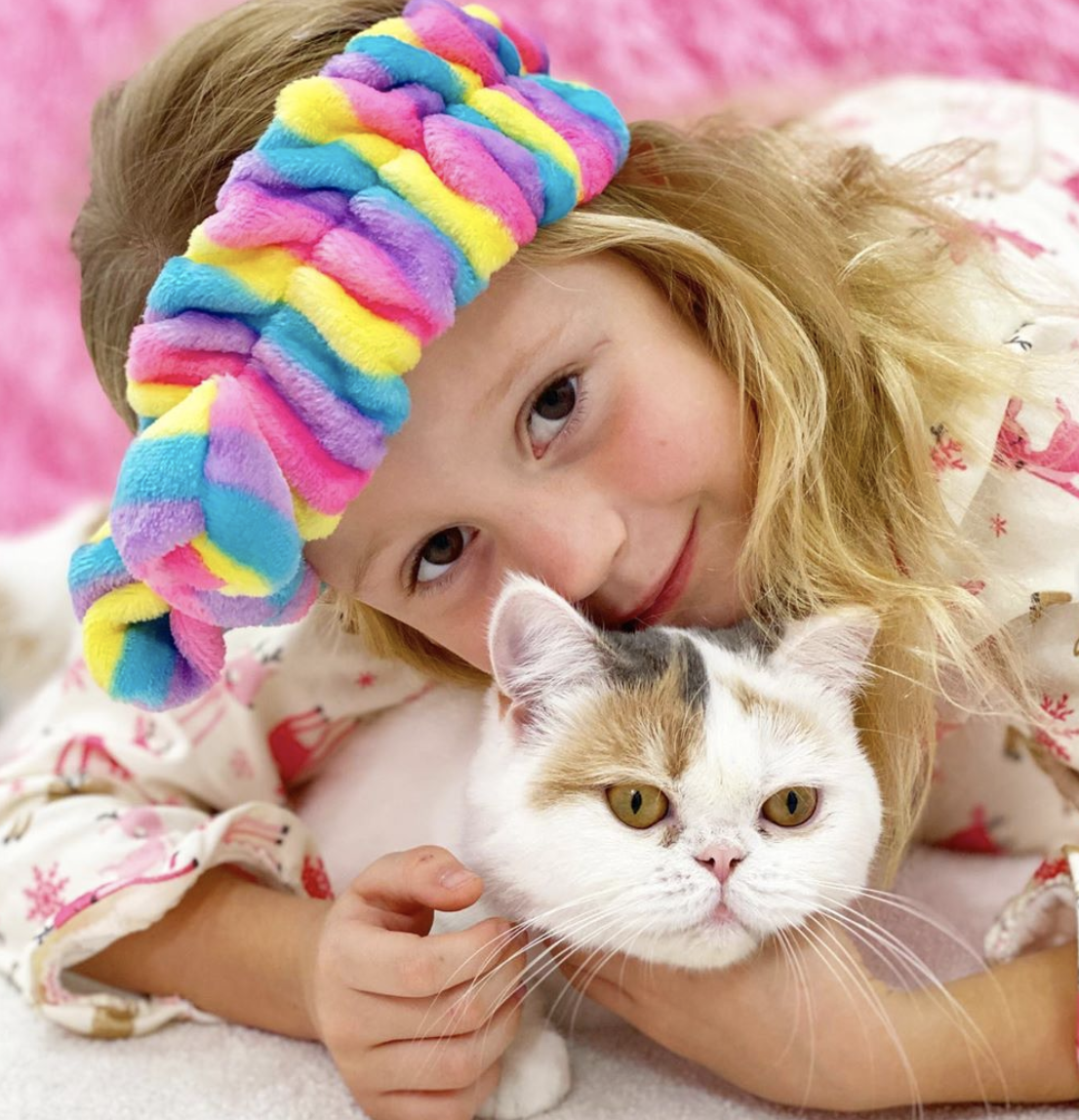
- Radzinskaya in 2019
- Born: Anastasia Radzinskaya; January 27, 2014 (age 12); Krasnodar Krai, Russia
- Occupation: YouTuber

YouTube information
- Channel: Like Nastya
- Years active: 2016–present
- Genres: Toy unboxing; vlogs
- Subscribers: 133.74 million (main channel); 203.74 million (combined) (Note: Subscribers, broken down by channel: 133,740,000 (Like Nastya) 23,000,000 (Like Nastya Vlog) 44,300,000 (Like Nastya Show) 2,690,000 (Nastya))
- Views: 123.6 billion (main channel); 158.41 billion (combined) (Note: Views, broken down by channel: 123,682,021,173 (Like Nastya) 11,278,294,613 (Like Nastya Vlog) 22,425,475,357 (Like Nastya Show) 1,030,604,694 (Nastya))
- Last updated: Nov 6, 2026

Anastasia Yuryevna Radzinskaya (Russian: Анастасия Юрьевна Радзинская; born January 27, 2014), known online as Like Nastya (Лайк Настя [ˌlajk ˈnasʲtʲə]), is a Russian-American YouTuber. She has a subsidiary channel called Learn Like Nastya.

== Content ==
Radzinskaya's content includes children's songs, educational entertainment, unboxings, vlogging, and roleplays. Her channels are dubbed into English, German, Arabic, Bangla, French, Portuguese, Hindi, Turkish, Spanish, Korean, Vietnamese, and Indonesian.

== History ==
Radzinskaya was born in Krasnodar Krai, Southern Russia. At birth, she was diagnosed with cerebral palsy, causing fears that she would not be able to speak.

Before starting their channel, Anastasia's mother Anna owned a bridal salon in Krasnodar while her father Sergey owned a construction company. In 2015, Radzinskaya's parents sold their companies, and in January 2016, they created their YouTube channel, which grew rapidly from their content. The family later relocated to Miami, Florida.

Radzinskaya's parents signed with multi-channel network Yoola. According to Forbes, Radzinskaya was "1 of the world's fastest-growing creators, thanks to videos in 7 languages" in 2019, becoming the 3rd highest-paid YouTuber in the world, with an estimated annual income of $18 million. As of 2024, her YouTube channel is one of the top 10 most subscribed YouTube channels.

Main channels' statistics (Nov 6, 2026)
Channel	Subscribers, millions	Views, billions	YouTube Creator Awards				
Channel	Subscribers, millions	Views, billions	YouTube Creator Awards	YouTube Creator Awards	YouTube Creator Awards	YouTube Creator Awards	YouTube Creator Awards
Channel	Subscribers, millions	Views, billions	0.1	1	10	50	100
Like Nastya	133.7	123.6	2016	2018	2018	2020	2022
Like Nastya Show	44.3	22.4	2017	2017	2019		
Like Nastya ESP	43.7	23.6	2017	2017	2019		
Like Nastya VNM	23.4	14.6	2020	2020	2022		
Like Nastya Vlog	23	11.2	2017	2017	2019		
Like Nastya AE	28.6	15.2	2019	2019	2020		
Like Nastya PRT	27	16.4	2019	2019	2020		
Like Nastya Live	2.7	1	2024	2024			

== Filmography ==
Year	Title	Role	Notes
2024	The Tiny Chef Show	Herself	Episode: "Ice Cream"

== See also ==
- List of YouTubers
- List of most-subscribed YouTube channels
- List of most-viewed YouTube channels
