= Autumn Fry =

American YouTuber (born 2012)

- Born: November 30, 2012 (age 13)
- Occupation: Kid influencer

YouTube information
- Channel: Autumn's Armory
- Years active: 2020–present
- Genre: Firearm reviews
- Subscribers: 283 thousand
- Views: 25.9 million
- Last updated: June 21, 2026
- Website: autumnsarmory.com

Autumn Fry (born November 30, 2012) is an American kid influencer known for reviewing and shooting firearms on her YouTube channel, Autumn's Armory. She began making videos in 2020 when she was seven years old, and has been the subject of controversy for her young age and video content.

== YouTube channel ==
Autumn Fry began shooting guns when she was two years old, and her first video was uploaded when she was seven years old. Her first video featured her reviewing and testing a Glock handgun. Her father, Randy Fry, taught her about guns from a young age and records her videos. She has reviewed and shot weapons such as the Colt AR-15, a SIG P320 RX Full Size, and an XM-42 flamethrower, among others. The channel makes money primarily from sponsored advertisements.

Autumn's father has described Autumn as "an amazing role model for our future", and stated that the general concept of the channel is "showing the world that guns can be a really fun thing, and people of any age can enjoy them". The Fry family previously traveled across the United States in a recreational vehicle, filming themselves shooting at various different gun ranges. In 2022, they purchased a piece of land in Texas. Autumn is homeschooled.

Fry's YouTube channel has been suspended multiple times, causing her to also host videos on Odysee. The channel sells merchandise such as t-shirts and posters.

== Controversy ==
Fry's YouTube channel has caused controversy among viewers, with critics claiming that her use of firearms as a child is inherently dangerous and that the channel is indicative of larger issues in American culture surrounding firearms. The channel has also been criticized as marketing firearms towards children. When asked about channels such as Autumn Fry's, a spokesperson for the White House said that such marketing was "abhorrent" and "especially alarming as we know that guns are the No. 1 killer of kids". The group Sandy Hook Promise said that companies paying child influencers to promote their guns "clearly know that they are marketing to children", specifically mentioning Autumn's Armory among other child firearm reviewers.
