= YouTube Creator Awards =

Media awards

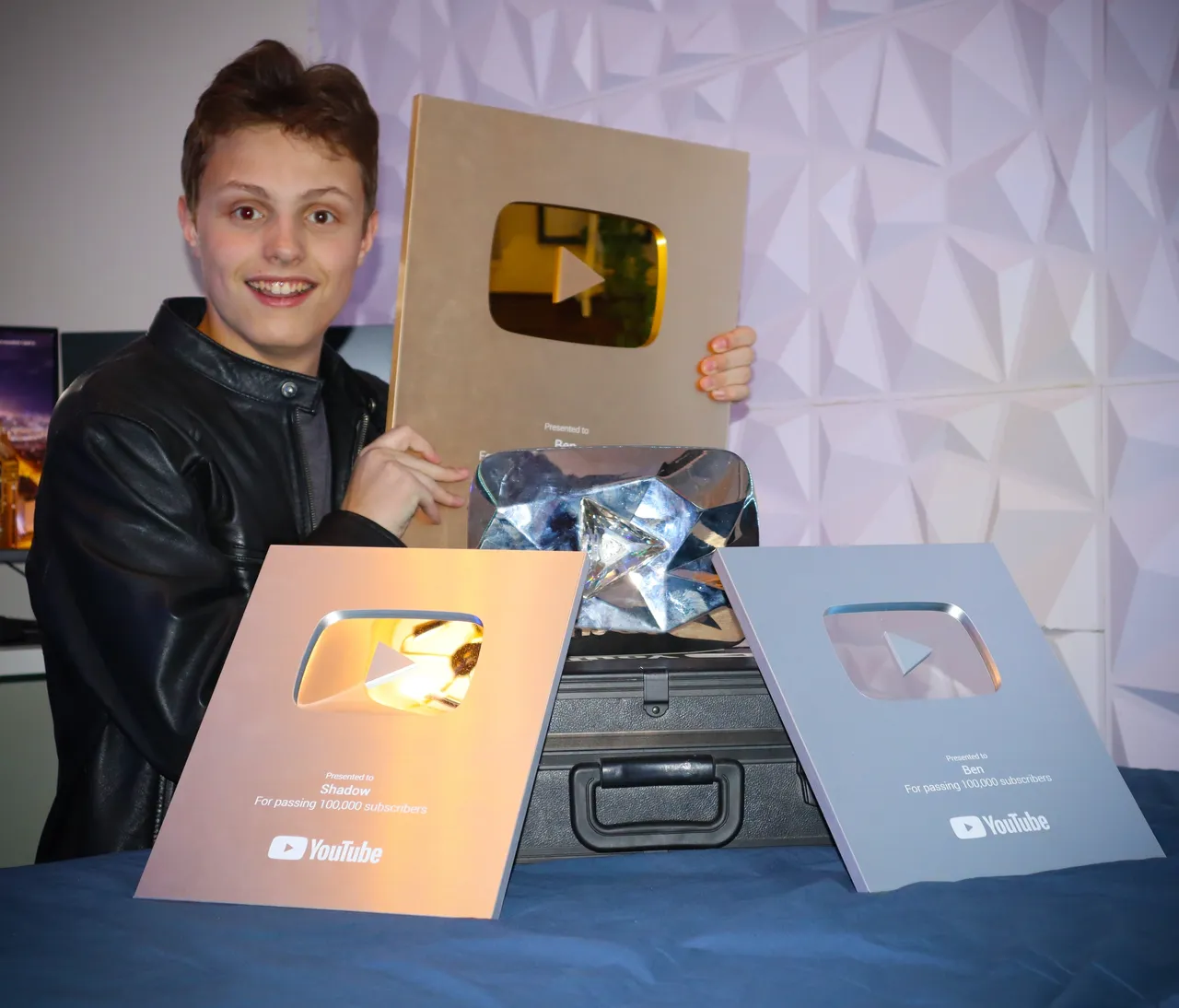
- Four YouTube Creator Awards
- Awarded for: Achieving a subscriber milestone on YouTube
- Country: Worldwide
- Presented by: YouTube
- First award: June 28, 2012; 14 years ago
- Website: Award page

YouTube Creator Awards, also known as YouTube Play Buttons, are a series of awards from the American video platform YouTube that aim to recognize its most popular channels. They are based on a channel's subscriber count but are offered at the sole discretion of YouTube. Each channel is reviewed before an award is issued to ensure that the channel follows the YouTube community guidelines. YouTube reserves the right to refuse to hand out a Creator Award, which it has done for channels featuring horror or extremist political content.

== Awards ==
When a YouTube channel reaches a specific milestone and is deemed eligible for a YouTube Creator Reward, they are awarded a relatively flat trophy in a metal casing with a YouTube play button symbol. The trophies are of different sizes: each button and plaque becomes progressively larger with the channel's subscriber count. The Gold Creator Award was introduced at VidCon 2012, alongside the Silver Creator Award at VidCon 2013 and the Diamond Creator Award at VidCon 2015. The Creator Awards are made by the New York firm Society Awards.

Prior to March 2021, YouTube featured three additional benefit levels. These are not eligible for Creator Rewards, but they do offer several preliminary benefits:

- Graphite was for channels with 1 to 999 subscribers.
- Opal was for channels with 1,000 to 9,999 subscribers. This is the minimum subscriber count required for the YouTube Partner Program, which also requires a minimum of 4,000 total viewer watch hours in the past 12 months, plus a manual review of the channel's content to determine compliance with the program guidelines.
- Bronze was for channels with 10,000 to 99,999 subscribers. The YouTube NextUp program is exclusive to channels meeting this threshold and other program criteria. This is also the minimum subscriber count required for a Spreadshop or Spring (formerly called "Teespring") merchandise shelf.

== List of award types ==
There are currently three regular Creator Awards tiers, plus a fourth and fifth that have been awarded a few times:

=== Silver Creator Award ===
Awarded to the channels that reach or surpass 100,000 subscribers. The old version was made of nickel-plated cupronickel alloy. The new version (as of March 1, 2017) is 92% nickel, 5% carbon and 2.5% zinc, with traces of other metals. In March 2018, the look of the Silver Play Button was updated from a metal button housed within a window box with the channel's name printed on the front glass pane to a cleaner-looking flat designed metal plaque award featuring the channel's name embossed on it. Channels at this level are also eligible to apply for a digital verification badge.

=== Gold Creator Award ===
Awarded to the channels that reach or surpass 1,000,000 subscribers. It is made of gold plated brass. In March 2018, the look of the Gold Play Button was updated from a metal button housed within a window box with the channel's name printed on the front glass pane to a cleaner-looking flat designed metal plaque award featuring the channel's name embossed on it.

=== Diamond Creator Award ===
Awarded to channels that reach or surpass 10 million subscribers. It is made of silver-plated metal inset with a large piece of colorless crystal in the shape of a play button triangle. When introduced during VidCon 2015, 35 channels qualified for the award. As of July 5, 2026, there are over 3,000 channels that have reached this level.

=== Custom Creator Award ===
Formerly awarded to channels that reach or surpass 50 million subscribers. As of September 1, 2020, it is the sole award to be missing from the Creator Awards FAQ. However, it continued to be granted at YouTube's discretion after this date. PewDiePie gave the nickname of Ruby Creator Award to this award, as he received a ruby-colored award in the shape of his channel's logo. The color can vary per creator, however: for example, T-Series received a colorless award, while Blackpink received a black award on top of a pink base. As of April 9, 2026, 101 channels have reached this level, but this playbutton is no longer awarded, although some channels received custom playbuttons for other milestones (e.g. America's Got Talent for 20 million and MrBeast for 200 million).

=== Red Diamond Creator Award ===
Awarded to channels that reach or surpass 100 million subscribers. Inspired by the Diamond Creator Award, it features a play button triangle with a large dark red crystal. It was added to the Creator Awards FAQ by September 1, 2020.

As of March 12, 2026, there are 17 channels that have reached this level:

1. (India) T-Series (May 29, 2019)
2. (Sweden) PewDiePie (August 25, 2019)
3. (United States) Cocomelon (December 12, 2020)
4. SET India (March 28, 2021)
5. (United States) MrBeast (July 28, 2022)
6. (Ukraine) (United States) Kids Diana Show (August 16, 2022)
7. (Russia) (United States) Like Nastya (August 25, 2022)
8. (Russia) (United States) Vlad and Niki (August 13, 2023)
9. (India) Zee Music Company (September 24, 2023)
10. (United States) WWE (March 8, 2024)
11. (India) Goldmines (September 20, 2024)
12. (United States) (China) Stokes Twins (November 30, 2024)
13. (India) Sony SAB (March 17, 2025)
14. (South Korea) KIMPRO (April 17, 2025)
15. (Argentina) Alejo Igoa (December 26, 2025)
16. (South Korea) Blackpink (February 20, 2026)
17. (United States) Alan's Universe (March 12, 2026)

=== 200M Award ===
Awarded to the channels that reach or surpass 200 million subscribers. This playbutton was revealed in a Matthew Beem video, where he transformed YouTuber MrBeast's House. It has a very similar design to the Red Diamond Award, though it features a yellow center-piece. It has been dubbed by many as the Amber Award, though YouTube has yet to give it an official name. As of 23 January 2026, there are only three channels eligible for this award – T-Series, MrBeast and Cocomelon.

=== 300M Award ===
Awarded to the channels that reach or surpass 300 million subscribers. This playbutton was also revealed in the same Matthew Beem video as the 200M Award. It follows the same pattern of the 200M and Red Diamond Awards, however this time with a green center-piece. Its unofficial name is the Emerald, or even Malachite Award, though YouTube has yet to give it an official name. As of 29 August 2025, there are only two channels eligible for this award – T-Series and MrBeast.

=== 400M Award ===
Awarded to the channels that reach or surpass 400 million subscribers. This playbutton was revealed in a post by MrBeast. The award features the same design as the three aforementioned awards, this time with a blue center-piece. It has been dubbed the Sapphire Award and the Blue Diamond award, though YouTube has yet to give it an official name. As of 29 August 2025, only creator MrBeast is eligible for this award.

=== 500M Award ===
Awarded to the channels that reach or surpass 500 million subscribers. This playbutton was revealed in a YouTube video by MrBeast. The award features a black-colored object in the shape of a Diamond creator award on the inside, with a metallic construct of the channel's mascot on the outside. YouTube has yet to give it an official name. As of 14 June 2026, only creator MrBeast is eligible for this award.

Silver, Gold, and Diamond Creator Awards
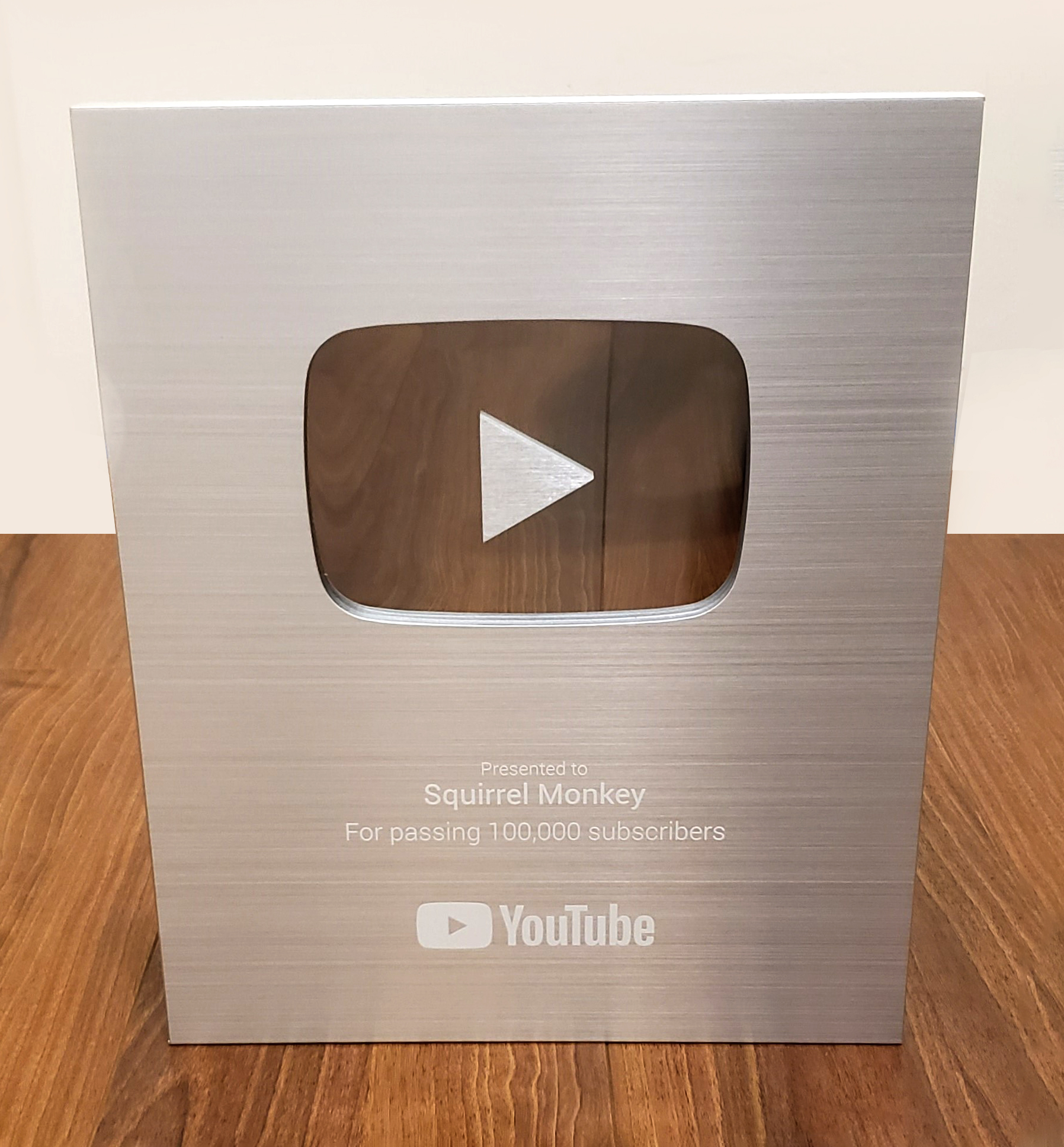
Example of a Silver Creator Award

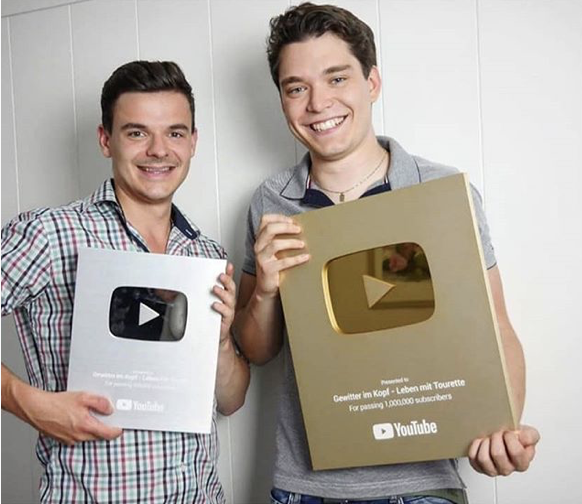
Left: Jan Zimmermann, Silver award
Right: Tim Lehmann, Gold award

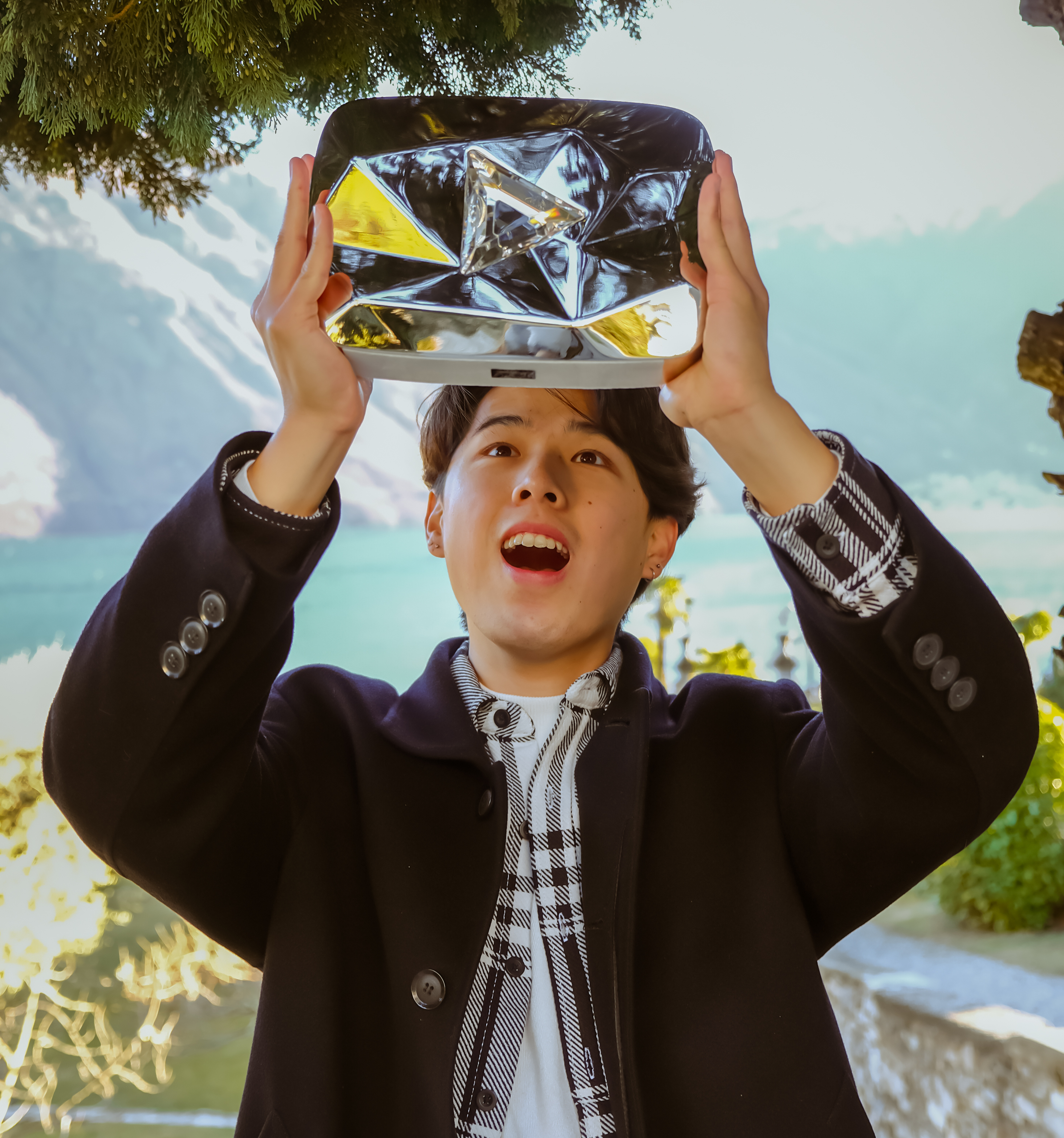
Italian YouTuber Panda Boi with his Diamond Creator Award
