= Cheetos =

Brand of corn puff snack food

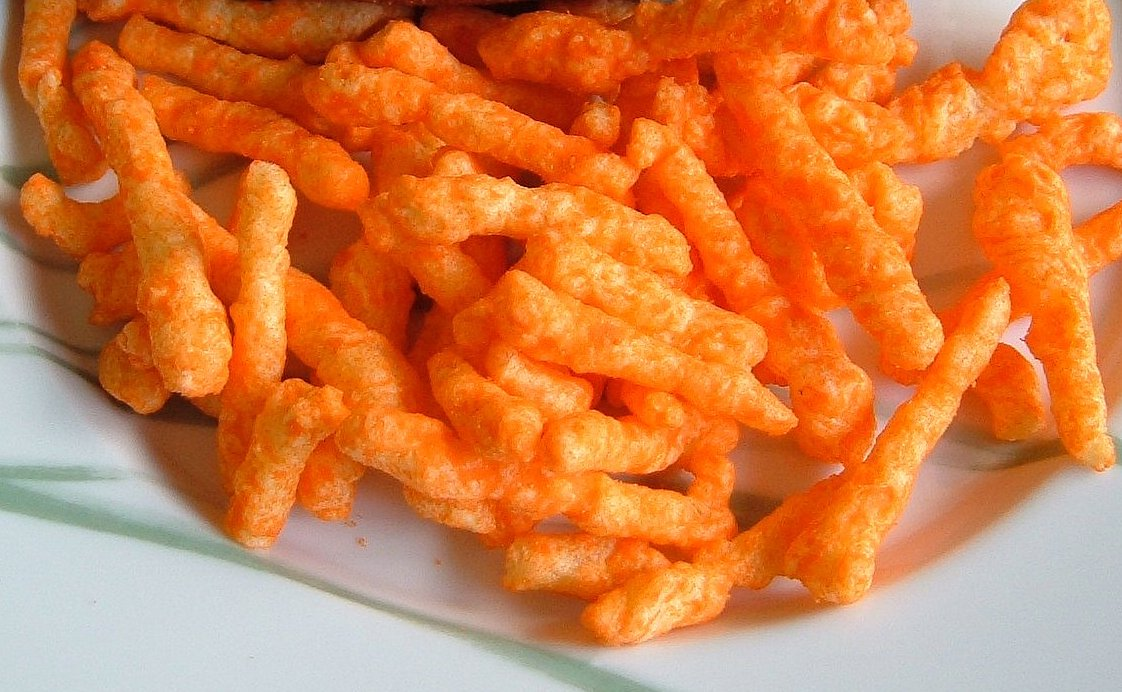
- Product type: Cheese curl, popcorn, macaroni and cheese
- Current owner: PepsiCo (via Frito-Lay)
- Country: United States
- Introduced: 1948; 78 years ago
- Markets: Worldwide
- Previous owners: The Frito Company
- Website: cheetos.com

Cheetos (formerly styled as Chee-tos) is a crunchy corn-cheese puff snack brand made by Frito-Lay, a subsidiary of PepsiCo. Fritos creator Charles Elmer Doolin invented Cheetos in 1948, and began national distribution in the United States. The initial success of Cheetos was a contributing factor to the merger between The Frito Company and H.W. Lay & Company in 1961 to form Frito-Lay. In 1965 Frito-Lay merged with The Pepsi-Cola Company, forming PepsiCo, the current owner of the Cheetos brand.

In 2010, Cheetos was ranked as the top selling brand of cheese puffs in its primary market of the U.S.; worldwide the annual retail sales totaled approximately $4 billion. The original Crunchy Cheetos are still in production but the product line has since expanded to include 21 different types of Cheetos in North America alone. As Cheetos are sold in more than 36 countries, the flavor and composition is often varied to match regional taste and cultural preferences—such as Savory American Cream in China, and Strawberry Cheetos in Japan.

== History ==
Cheetos were invented in 1948 by Fritos creator Charles Elmer Doolin, who cooked early test batches in the Frito Company's research and development kitchen in Dallas, Texas. The cheese-flavored snack sold quickly, but Doolin did not have the production or distribution capacity to support a nationwide launch. This led Doolin to partner with potato chip businessman Herman W. Lay for marketing and distribution, and Cheetos were introduced nationally in the U.S. in 1948, along with a potato product called Fritatos. The success of Cheetos prompted Doolin and Lay to merge their two companies in 1961, forming Frito-Lay Inc. At the time, Cheetos was one of four large snack food brands produced by the company, which had annual revenues of $127 million. Frito-Lay merged with the Pepsi-Cola Company to form PepsiCo in 1965, prompting further distribution of Cheetos outside of North America.

While Cheetos were not the first snack food of its kind (Elmer's Chee Wee's were created in 1933), newer competing products in the snack food category have since emerged—including Utz Cheese Curls, Herr's Cheese Curls and Wise Cheez Doodles, along with Planters' Cheese Puffs and Cheese Curls. Most of the competing cheese-flavored snacks are distributed in specific regions of the U.S., and as of 2010 Cheetos remains as the top-selling cheese puff in America.

As of 2011, Cheetos are produced, marketed and distributed under three different PepsiCo operating divisions: PepsiCo Americas Foods (which includes Frito-Lay in the United States and Canada, Sabritas in Mexico and Latin Americas Foods in Brazil, Colombia, Argentina, Venezuela, and Peru), PepsiCo Europe and PepsiCo APAC and AMESA. PepsiCo also granted a license to the Strauss-Elite company to distribute the Cheetos snack. In 2010, worldwide annual sales of Cheetos totaled approximately $4 billion, making it the 11th-largest PepsiCo brand.

In 2021, PepsiCo and Indofood announced that Indofood CBP has officially purchased all of the shares owned by Fritolay Netherlands Holding B.V., an affiliate of PepsiCo at PT Indofood Fritolay Makmur (IFL, now PT Indofood Fortuna Makmur) worth IDR 494 billion, thus the production of Lay's, Cheetos, and Doritos brand snacks in Indonesia were stopped on 18 August 2021. In addition, PepsiCo and its affiliates has also agreed not to produce, package, sell, market or distribute snack products that compete with IFL products in Indonesia for a period of three years. The Cheetos brand produced by Indofood has since been renamed into new variants of Chiki (Twist, Puffs, and Net). Indonesia is the only Cheetos market that sells Roasted Corn flavor of Cheetos while Doritos would take on the new name Maxicorn.

In February 2025, Cheetos was reintroduced in Indonesia, where it is produced by PT PepsiCo Indonesia Foods and Beverages in Cikarang, Bekasi Regency, West Java, is available in three flavors, Cheese, Roasted Corn Cheese, and Sweet Cheese.

== Products and distribution ==
The first Cheetos product was Crunchy Cheetos, invented in 1948 in San Antonio, Texas. Crunchy Cheetos remained the brand's sole product for 23 years until the introduction of Cheetos Puffs in 1971. The baked varieties, otherwise known as Baked Cheetos, became available beginning in 2004. As of 2010, there are 21 different variants of Cheetos snacks distributed in the United States. In addition to the original Crunchy Cheetos, Cheetos Puffs and Baked varieties are sold in alternate shape and flavor variations—including a spicy variety known as Flamin' Hot Cheetos.

Cheetos are among the snack varieties included in the Frito-Lay Munchies snack mix.

With the introduction of Frito-Lay's Natural line, Natural Cheetos were introduced in the mid-2000s, touting all-natural ingredients and real Wisconsin white cheddar cheese. They accompany other Frito-Lay products in the Natural line and compete in the market space occupied by other health-conscious snack foods, such as Pirate's Booty. The Natural brand was re-branded to Simply in 2014.

Cheetos first entered Brazil in 1976, followed by other countries such as Australia during the 1980s. In 1994, Cheetos became the first American brand of snack food to be made and distributed in China. As the distribution of Cheetos expanded outside the U.S. to include more than 36 countries, localized versions were produced to conform to regional tastes and cultural preferences.

Frito-Lay conducted extensive testing before settling on flavors for the Chinese market, with ranch dressing, North Sea crab, smoked octopus and caramel being passed up for two flavors: Savory American Cream and Zesty Japanese Steak. These flavors were produced as the result of focus group testing, in which the original Crunchy Cheetos did not test as well. Strawberry Cheetos, a plain corn Cheeto coated in strawberry icing, were released in Japan in 2008. In 2013, a Pepsi-flavored Cheeto was introduced in Japan, and a Mountain Dew-flavored variety was available in 2014. In India, Cheetos Whoosh are sold, made of ingredients such as whole grain and vegetables.

In 2015, Frito-Lay released a limited edition cinnamon sugar-flavored snack called Sweetos to U.S. markets. Sweetos were the first sweet snack that Cheetos had released in the United States in the brand's 67-year history.

In the first week of 2020, Frito-Lay began distributing "Cheetos popcorn".

In August 2020, Frito-Lay introduced Mac n' Cheetos, a Cheetos macaroni and cheese.

In November 2025, Frito-Lay announced it would be introducing Simply NKD Cheeto Puffs and Flamin' Hot Cheetos, a version of Cheetos without artificial colors, in response to the FDA's initiative to phase out petrolium-based food coloring such as Red 40 from the American food supply.

=== Flamin' Hot Cheetos ===
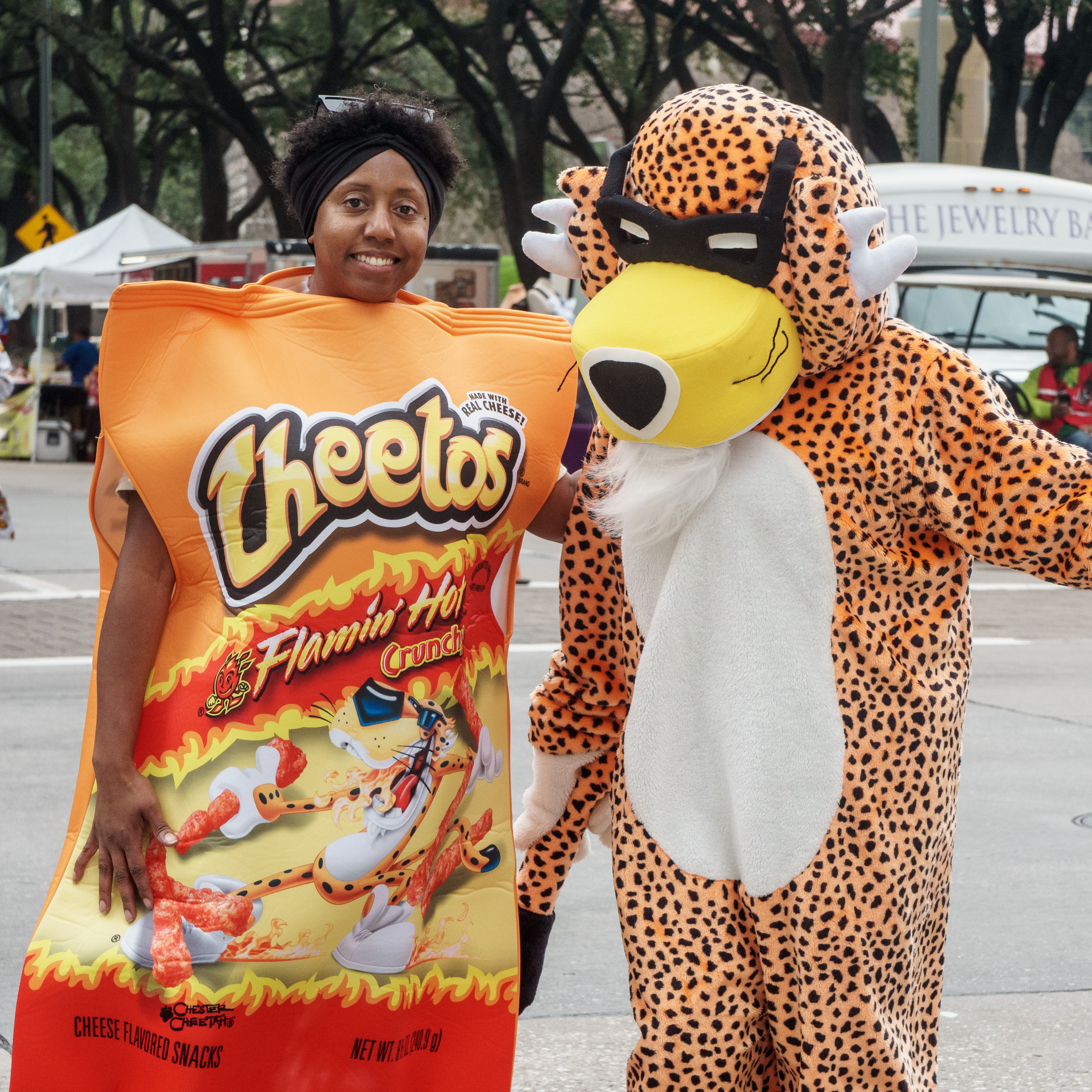
Young woman in a Flamin' Hot costume with Chester Cheetah

According to Frito-Lay records, Flamin' Hot Cheetos, a spicy version of the product, was developed at the company's headquarters in Texas starting in 1989, as part of a project led by Lynne Greenfeld, and introduced in test markets in the summer of 1990, alongside Flamin' Hot versions of Fritos and Lays. They became available nationwide in early 1992, and The Washington Post would go on to call them "something of a cultural phenomenon", with Newsweek noting that it "rejuvenated the brand" and would become a "central element in Cheetos marketing".

Beginning in the late 2000s, Richard Montañez, who had started his career at Frito-Lay as a plant janitor and later became a marketing director for the company, claimed that he had invented Flamin' Hot Cheetos in the early 1990s while still a janitor, observing that the brand did not have any products targeting Latinos. Montañez claimed he had pitched his idea to CEO Roger Enrico as part of Enrico's initiative to empower employees to help the fledgeling company. In 2018, Fox Searchlight started developing a biopic about the origin story of Flamin' Hot Cheetos as told by Montañez. It starred Jesse Garcia as Montañez and marked actress Eva Longoria's feature directorial debut. Hulu and Disney+ released the film, titled Flamin' Hot, in 2023.

In May 2021, the Los Angeles Times reported that Frito-Lay had begun an internal investigation in 2018 following a complaint by Greenfeld. The company, which had not previously contradicted Montañez's story publicly, said of the results of that investigation: "None of our records show that Richard [Montañez] was involved in any capacity in the Flamin' Hot test market ... we do not credit the creation of Flamin' Hot Cheetos or any Flamin' Hot products to him." Additional reporting by the Times indicated that Montañez's claims did not line up with other events in the product's release timeline, including newspaper articles announcing the test market release in 1990, and Enrico not joining Frito-Lay until later that year. However, the Times noted a 1993 U.S. News & World Report story indicating that Montañez was responsible for suggesting subsequent product ideas that built on the Flamin' Hot line, including Flamin' Hot Popcorn.

Montañez has stood by his claims following the LA Times investigation, arguing that there was a lack of documentation because of the low level of his job at the time, but adding that he was not aware of what might have been going on in other divisions of the company, and thus he did not have reason to dispute Greenfeld's accounts.

== Manufacturing ==
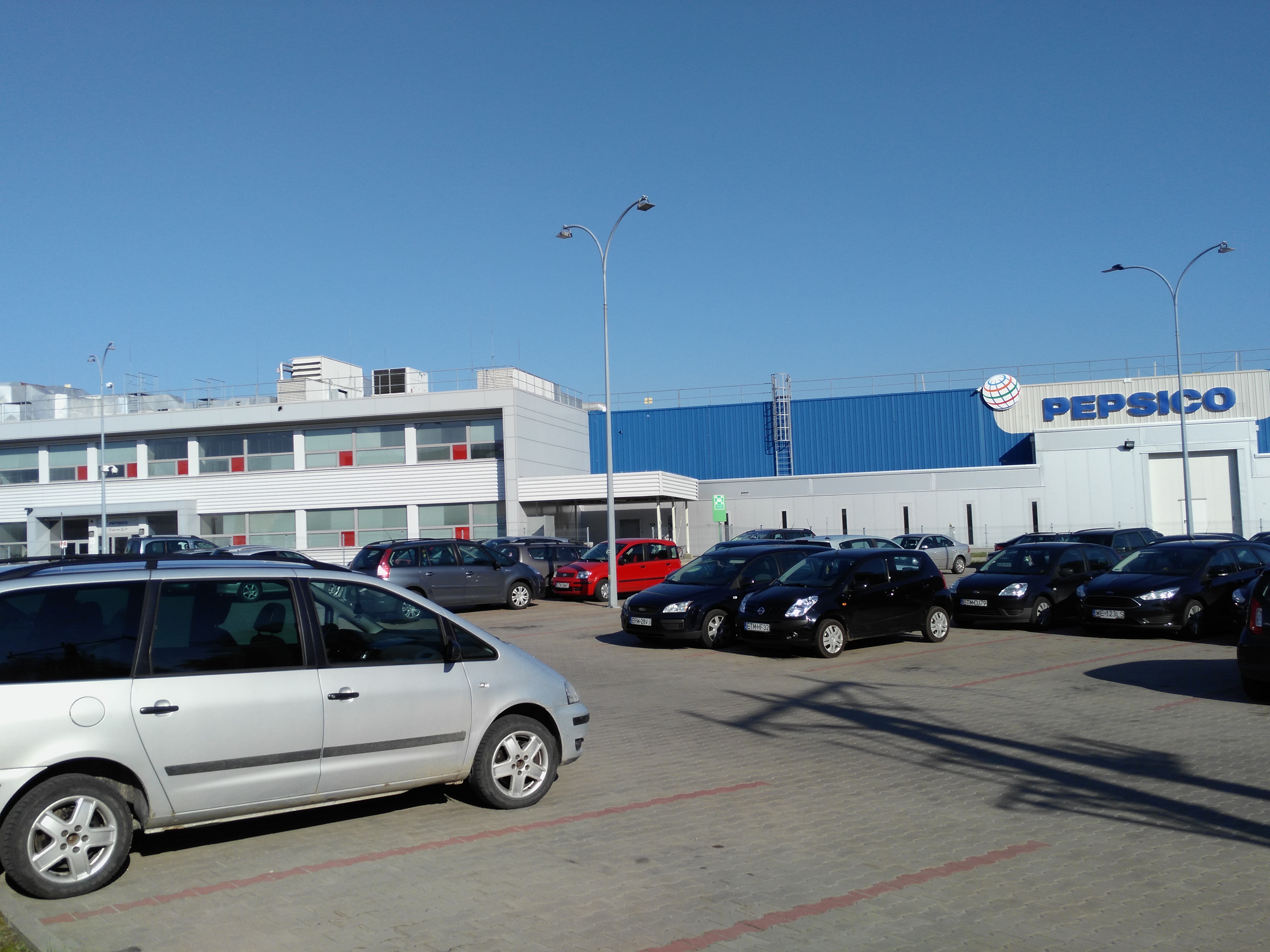
Factory producing Cheetos in Tomaszów Mazowiecki, Poland

Cheetos are manufactured by blending corn and water. The germ of the corn is removed to prevent spoiling; the germless corn is then ground into cornmeal. Because the cornmeal lacks the nutrients provided by the germs, it is enriched by adding nutrients in order to increase its nutritional value. (Enriched cornmeal is found in the following flavors: Crunchy, Puffs, Flamin' Hot Crunchy, Flamin' Hot Puffs, Flamin' Hot Limon Crunchy, XXTRA Flamin' Hot Crunchy, Reduced Fat Flamin' Hot Puffs, Reduced Fat Puffs, and Cheddar Jalapeño Crunchy.) The mixture is heated under pressure, and then extruded through a die. The texture of the snack is formed as a result of contact with hot air, causing steam in the mixture to expand and creating its characteristic texture. After oven-drying or frying, the product is then tumbled with the desired flavor components (the original Crunchy Cheetos are fried). The process takes approximately 19 minutes and each half hour an in-house lab team inspects and taste-tests each batch. At this point, the result of the inspection is determined by comparing each batch to product sent from Frito-Lay headquarters. Other flavor and format variations such as Cheetos Puffs, Cheetos Paws, Cheetos Twists, Cheetos Balls, and Cheetos Whirls are all finished with a drying stage in large ovens. As of 2010, Frito-Lay has 14 fried-Cheetos plants in 11 states throughout the United States.

== Marketing ==
The first Cheetos mascot was the animated Cheetos Mouse, which debuted in early 1971, around the same time as Cheetos Puffs. The Cheetos Mouse spoke with an upper class accent, and typically wore a three piece suit. He used the slogans "Chee-tos. Cheese that goes crunch!" and several years later, "Hail Chee-sar!". The Cheetos Mouse was seen in television commercials, print ads and used for various promotional Cheetos merchandise until the character was phased out around 1979.

The Cheetos brand is commonly recognized by association with its second and current mascot, an anthropomorphic sly, smooth-voiced cartoon cheetah named Chester Cheetah. Chester first appeared in television commercials in 1986, known for concluding Cheetos advertisements with slogans, which have evolved over time. He used both "The cheese that goes crunch!" and "It ain't easy bein' cheesy" as slogans from 1986 to 1997, and then "Dangerously cheesy" from 1997 onwards. In 2003, Chester was first rendered as a computer-generated character in the United States, while continuing to appear in a traditionally animated form in some other countries where the brand is sold.

Beginning in 2008, Cheetos advertising and promotion broadened in regard to age appeal, with a revised focus on an adult demographic. In their "Orange Underground" campaign, Chester speaks with a deep voice and encourages people to use their Cheetos in acts of revenge, pranks, or to solve problems through "Random Acts of Cheetos". In February 2009, Cheetos was the subject of its first Super Bowl commercial. In the US$3 million, 30 second advertisement, a "loud, chatty woman" is talking on her mobile phone at a restaurant. Chester the Cheetah persuades another customer to toss Cheetos onto the ground, attracting a flock of birds to drive away the obnoxious loud-talking customer. The campaign won the 2009 Grand Ogilvy Award from the Advertising Research Foundation.

In 2009, Frito-Lay invited popular blogs including Boing Boing and Mashable to create online ads for Cheetos, with the blogs having complete creative control.

On August 15, 2017, Frito-Lay announced the opening of its The Spotted Cheetah pop-up restaurant in New York, with dishes made with Cheetos with chef Anne Burrell. According to The Wall Street Journal, the restaurant's reserve spots quickly sold out.

== See also ==
- Cheezies
- Kurkure
- List of brand name snack foods
- Mac n' Cheetos
- Pirate's Booty
- Takis
- Twisties
- Wotsits
