= Gaza: How to Survive a Warzone =

2025 documentary

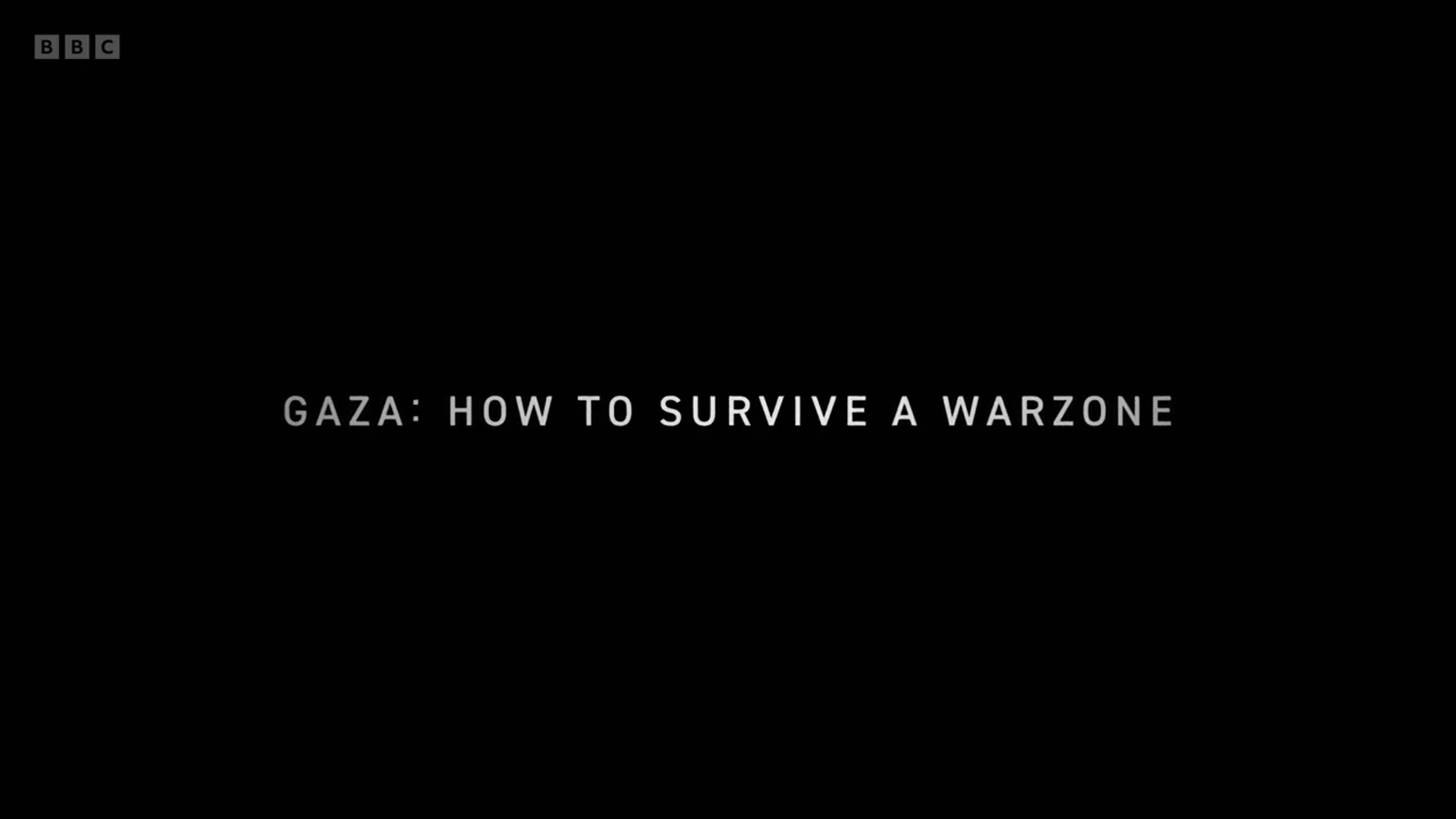
- Directed by: Jamie Roberts; Yousef Hammash
- Produced by: Hoyo Films
- Narrated by: Abdullah Al-Yazouri
- Distributed by: BBC Two
- Release date: 17 February 2025 (United Kingdom)
- Running time: 59 minutes
- Country: United Kingdom
- Language: English

Gaza: How to Survive a Warzone is a 2025 British documentary film co-directed by Jamie Roberts and Yousef Hammash from Hoyo Films. The documentary was commissioned by BBC Current Affairs and This World for BBC Two and BBC iPlayer. The film follows the lives of four young people living in the Gaza war. The BBC pulled the film from its iPlayer after it was reported that the film's narrator was allegedly the son of a man who worked in the Ministry of Agriculture of Gaza's Hamas-run government.

== Synopsis ==
The film follows four young people as they navigate life in Gaza:

- Abdullah Al-Yazouri: A 13-year-old boy who lives in a tent after being forced to evacuate his home. Abdullah also serves as the film's narrator. His father, who does not appear in the film, is Gaza's deputy agriculture minister.
- Renad Attallah: A 10-year-old girl who copes with the conflict by creating a cooking show on TikTok, and who celebrates the April 2024 Iranian strikes against Israel.
- Zakaria: A mischievous 11-year-old boy who volunteers at Shuhada al-Aqsa Hospital as a paramedic's assistant.
- Rana: A 24-year-old woman who gives birth during the war and struggles to care for her newborn child.

The film depicts their daily lives, marked by air strikes and efforts to maintain normalcy, and captures moments of hope amidst the destruction.

== Production ==
For nine months the film was filmed by two Gazan cameramen, Amjad Al Fayoumi and Ibrahim Abu Ishaiba, who were remotely directed by Jamie Roberts and Yousef Hammash. Roberts called it "the only truly observational film in Gaza during the conflict" due to foreign journalists being banned from entering Gaza during that time.

After the film's controversial release, the BBC demanded a "full audit of expenditure" from Hoyo Films. The BBC paid £400,000 to Hoyo to produce the film, and Hoyo paid Abdullah's mother £790 for her son's narration.

== Reception ==
=== Critical response ===
Jack Seale from The Guardian gave the film 5/5 stars, praising its depiction of children dealing with bombing attacks with matter-of-fact bravery and determination to smile.

Anita Singh from The Daily Telegraph gave the film 4/5 stars, praising its overall value and emotional impact but felt the inclusion of adults' stories next to children's stories felt misplaced. She argued this led to "glaring" omissions such as the documentary producers not "pressing" the single mother on her views of the 7 October attacks.

=== BBC controversy ===
Soon after the film was released, the activist and journalist David Collier reported that the film's narrator Abdullah was the son of a Hamas official. His father, Ayman al-Yazouri, is a deputy minister for agriculture in the Hamas administration, although he has also been described as a "technocrat with a scientific rather than political background". Hamas is a proscribed terrorist organization in the UK, Israel, and other countries. Danny Cohen, a former BBC controller, led criticism of the BBC for not disclosing this before transmission.

The BBC stated that it was not informed about the narrator's connection to Hamas by the film's production company. The BBC initially added a message to the program clarifying the family link, but later removed the film from iPlayer so it could perform further due diligence. Following an initial review, the BBC said it found "serious flaws" in the documentary's production process and would perform a full audit on the film's expenditures. Culture secretary Lisa Nandy held a meeting with the chair of the BBC about the film.

Others defended the film, emphasizing its value in humanising Palestinian children and providing insights into life in Gaza. Chris Doyle, director of the Council for Arab-British Understanding, expressed regret over the film's removal and stressed the importance of an independent review. Richard Sanders, a Gaza documentary filmmaker and journalist, called the BBC's decision to pull the film "cowardly". Artists for Palestine UK published an open letter criticising the campaign against the documentary. Pro-Palestinian protesters projected the film onto the BBC Scotland headquarters in Glasgow while chanting anti-BBC slogans.

The Telegraph and others criticised the film for translating the Arabic word Yahud or Yahudy as "Israelis" and not "Jews". Some have argued that the translation is closer to what the speaker intends to say in this particular context, and back in 2013 the BBC editorial standards committee had determined that "Israeli" was an acceptable translation for "Yahud".

Peter Johnston conducted an internal review for the BBC which determined the film breached its editorial rule on accuracy. Johnston faulted Hoyo Films for not disclosing al-Yazouri's ties to Hamas, and criticised BBC executives for not researching this before the film was published. However, he found no other breaches of editorial guidelines—including on impartiality—and no evidence of improper external influence. To address criticism of censoring stories from Gaza the BBC announced that a shorter version of the film would be added to iPlayer. Britain's media regulator Ofcom announced its findings in October 2025, finding that the film violated broadcasting rules, was "materially misleading" and could erode the trust that audiences would have placed in the BBC. It instructed the BBC to broadcast a statement with the findings. The BBC accepted the ruling, noting that it aligned with its own internal review.

== See also ==
- Effect of the Gaza war on children in the Gaza Strip
- Gaza: Doctors Under Attack, documentary dropped by the BBC
- Gaza Strip under Hamas
