= Kid influencer =

Young social media influencer

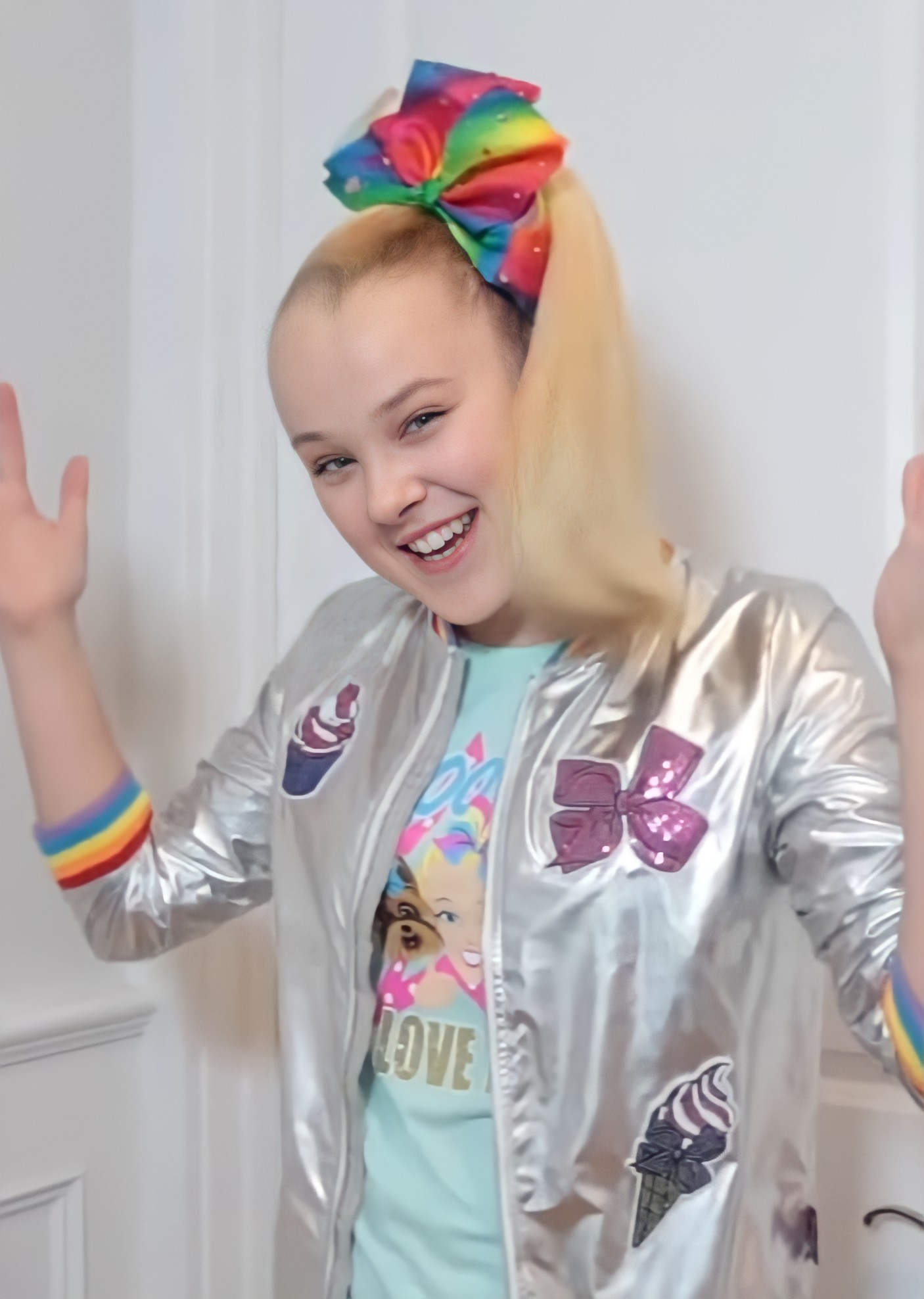
Media personality JoJo Siwa at age 15 on her YouTube channel

A kid influencer or kidfluencer is someone under the age of 18 who has built or is building a presence on social media platforms creating content to generate views and engagements, that is often sponsored. Kid influencers operate in a similar fashion to adult influencers; they share their hobbies and personal activities with their audiences, while also marketing products that align with their brand through paid partnerships. Many social media platforms have an age minimum requiring users to be at least 13 years of age or older to hold their own accounts. This requirement results in many of the pages being run alongside the parent/guardian of the child when they are under the age requirement.

In 2020, influencer marketing company Grin named The Axel Show, Tiana Wilson, twins Mila and Emma, and Greta Thunberg as some of the top kid influencers.

The rise of this kind of advertising has raised many ethical and legal questions, especially since most of these influencers' main fanbases are young children. It has also brought up concerns about protecting the child themselves from any corruption and/or manipulation from their parent or the brands they work with.

== Definitions and distinctions ==
Kid influencers differ from several related categories. A kid influencer typically refers to a minor whose likeness and personality form the central part of monetized social media content. By contrast, family vloggers maintain channels run by parents where children frequently appear but are not always the primary focus. This also differs from traditional child acting, which is governed by established labor laws, union protections, and regulated working hours. These distinctions matter because each category interacts differently with digital labor expectations, privacy concerns, and compensation structures.

== History ==
=== Early advertising ===
Children have been in the entertainment space for a long time. In 1914, Jackie Coogan was appearing in silent films, and appeared in many films after that. By the time he turned 21 the $4 million he had earned throughout his career as a child star had been wasted by his parents. Coogan sued them, and was awarded $126,000. This led to the creation of the California Child Actor's Bill (Coogan Act), which was passed in 1939. Although the Coogan Act originally applied only to film and television performers, updated versions of the law now protect children featured in monetized online content.

In recent years, lawmakers have noted that the early exploitation of child actors like Coogan parallels current concerns about kid influencers, prompting states such as California to extend child labor protections to social media performers.

When that space flourished, brands started picking up child actors to appear as spokespeople in commercials and paper ads, such as Shirley Temple for Royal Crown Cola in 1944.

In 1940, when television entered the homes of families across the nation, some of the earliest programming was directed at child viewers, including after-school and Saturday morning shows, to help keep kids entertained when the parents were consumed by other tasks.

Between the 1940s and 1950s, as these child-directed shows flourished, advertising took to the silver screen and often featured the same child actors who starred in the popular shows, like Miss France's Ding Dong School and Rootie Kazootie, who would interrupt programming to deliver commercial messages which reduced the lack of clarity between what was programming and what was an advertisement. This began to fizzle out as the very same actors and presenters began to refuse commercial work to focus on creative and theatrical work.

=== Advertising in the 1960s, 1970s & 1980s ===
As actors began to shift away from the commercial limelight, brands began to recognize that they still needed children in the advertisements to relate to the children they were targeting. From this an alternative grew, featuring child actors with little to no notoriety. They were often filmed playing with the toy and delivering a maximum of one or two speaking lines. Brands wanted to communicate the relatability of unknown actors who looked and acted like the kids they were targeting, to establish a sense of resemblance which then would turn into desire to have the product. Popular examples of this practice can be seen in commercials for popular toys at the time like G.I. Joe and Barbie dolls.

=== Mommy blogging in the 2000s & 2010s ===
From the early 2000s to the early 2010s, mommy blogging became a popular form of media for mothers to share their parenting experiences. This community helped mothers feel comfortable with their lives postpartum. The mommy blogging community consisted primarily of white suburban women, although there were exceptions. These mothers shared personal details about their children, opening that private information to the public. Some mommy blogs were then given paid partnerships, allowing parents to profit from their children's stories and images without consent. This content eventually shifted to a video format, known as family vlogging.

== Transition to influencer marketing ==
Child Influencers are a continuation of those same practices on a different scale. Blending the lines of stardom and relatability, child influencers create a different kind of relationship with their audience that is close knit and connected which they are constantly trying to nurture and grow. Kid influencers, and influencers in general, have built a close relationship with their following that makes their audience feel like they are a part of a community.

One of the first to make big waves in the space was seven-year-old Ryan Kaji or better known to his fans as Ryan's World, who began filming videos in 2015 and as of March 14, 2024 has amassed a following of 36.6 million YouTube subscribers. Kaji has a variety of videos on his channel from family vlogs to viral challenges, but his channel is most well-known for his toy review videos in which he plays with new toys and shares his opinion on them. Brands recognized the potential of how powerful a child's influence actually is and acted on the opportunity to tap into their audience to make profits.

=== Alternative approach ===
A more common approach into the market has been through the parents of the child sharing content featuring their child on that parent's account. When the child gains enough recognition, parents then create a separate page for them to form their own following and image independent of the parents'. The reason both these approaches are valid is because the parent is still the account owner, but the star is the child.

Global trends While kid influencing is especially prominent in North America and Western Europe, similar content has expanded rapidly in non-Western regions such as South Korea, India, Indonesia, and Brazil. These countries have large digital economies and high youth social-media engagement, yet most lack dedicated regulations governing monetized child content. Researchers note that differences in cultural norms, digital literacy, and enforcement capacity may contribute to a wider regulatory gap outside the Western world.

== Kid agencies ==
When influencers gain a substantial following, many brands may begin to partner with a creator. This can be overwhelming, and the creator may look to find an agent who specializes in influencer marketing to help manage their brand. Influencer marketing agencies can connect their influencers with brands that fit their niche/brand. The agent acts as a mediator between an influencer and the brand to make the process more efficient for the influencer. To fit the influx of kid influencers applying to agencies, some have created specialized programs, like batteryPOP's Kidfluencer program, from the company that trademarked the term "kidfluencers," to provide a guided journey into influencer life for kids. The demand for kid-specialized agents has grown as fully dedicated companies like PocketWatch have completely narrowed their scope to only working with child influencers/stars.

== Criticisms ==
Parents and guardians of kid influencers have received criticism from children's rights advocates and psychologists due to the unknown nature of the internet and the lack of transparency on sponsored posts. The blurred line of paid promotions versus organic content is nothing new amongst the influencer industry; however, the stakes are heightened with kid influencers as much of their audience is made up of children who do not necessarily have the media literacy skills to determine what is an advertisement and what is an unbiased opinion.

Abuse of child performers is also a major concern.

In 2019, watchdog agency Truth in Advertising (TINA) filed a deceptive advertising complaint with the Federal Trade Commission (FTC) against Ryan Kaji, asking the organization to review the influential marketing tactics he was using to promote products to his young audience, as TINA believed he was using deceptive marketing tactics against his vulnerable audience.

=== Ethical considerations ===
Many also have taken issue with the ethics of kid influencing, as there is not much research that demonstrates the long-term effects of fame and notoriety with influencers at such a young age. Children are being targeted by influencers and brands in ways that parents do not recognize as easily. Advertising to kids has been regulated by the government in the past, but not necessarily when it is the kid doing the advertising themselves. Parents of kid influencers argue that because it is often the parent doing most of the logistical background work, the kids cannot tell the difference from genuinely playing with toys versus doing so for paid promotion. There are many sides to the argument, but all can agree that there needs to be a discussion about teaching media literacy to children if they are going to be navigating the internet alone. Another concern is the amount of time spent working. The Coogan Act limits the amount of time children can work. Kid influencers are not protected under the Coogan Act and can work as much as they want or as much as their parents make them.

Critics of increased regulation argue that imposing strict labor-style rules on social-media content may interfere with family autonomy, discourage creative expression, or place unnecessary burdens on small-scale creators. These critics suggest emphasizing education and parental guidance rather than government intervention.

=== Influencer parents & families ===
There is a concern that parents are exploiting their children on social media for money. Companies capitalize on the success of these children and family channels. So, these children become exposed to financial exploitation from parents and big companies. There is currently no regulation for how much exposure parents showcase their children on social media. There is also no regulation for how much these parents make their children work on social media (doing TikToks, YouTube videos, etc.). There is also no regulation for who and where the money goes to that is generated through the content produced. These children cannot consent to being broadcast online either since they are just doing what their parents ask, and since they are growing up in the world of social media they think it is normal. There is also the concern that family-centric content creators are broadcasting their kids far too often. Many already established family content creators have their cameras on the child as soon as they are born. These newborns are put onto display and are now part of the influencer family. Since they are only babies they have no say or consent to how they are being portrayed online.

Researchers note that the experiences of family vlog participants may differ from those of individual kid influencers, since the former often appear as part of broader family-oriented content rather than as the central personality. These distinctions are important when considering issues such as consent, autonomy, and financial compensation.

=== Child safety concerns ===
There is a lack of protection set in place for kid influencers. It is common for influencers to hold physical meet and greets. When a kid influencer organizes such an event, there is typically no age limit for who can meet the child. This lack of protection leaves the kid influencer physically vulnerable to strangers of any age. These types of meetings are often used as a cash grab by the parents, bringing up concerns about child exploitation for profit. Kid influencers are also subject to mental and emotional harm when having a strong online presence.

=== Future effects on kid influencers ===
Since most kid influencers do not have a say in the social media world they are thrusted into, they may not like how they have been portrayed online. As these kids turn into teens and adults they will start to form their own identities and how they were portrayed by their parents online may not be who they truly are. They will also have to deal with the embarrassment of being recorded in their vulnerable moments. One of the main distinctions between child influencers and child actors is that the actors are playing a character the influencers are not. An example of this comes from an influencer family called The LaBrant Fam: they filmed a video of them telling their daughter that they were giving away their family dog as an April Fools Joke. Their daughter was filmed crying and posted online for content. The Labrants later posted a video apologizing for putting their daughter in that spot.

== Legal ==
Jurisdiction	Regulation	Key Requirements	Enforcement
France	Studer Bill (2020)	Registration of monetized content; earnings placed in protected account	Labor authorities
California (U.S.)	Coogan Act	15% earnings in Coogan trust; expanded to influencers in 2024	Courts & labor agencies
Illinois (U.S.)	Child Influencer Law (2024)	Children in 30%+ of content must receive compensation	Legal action allowed for minors
Minnesota (U.S.)	Child Online Entertainment Law (2025)	100% earnings go to child under 14; content deletion rights	State enforcement
Other regions	No specific regulation	—	—

=== Lack of laws protecting kid influencers ===
There are very few laws protecting child influencers. Currently, there are no federal laws that state child influencers should receive compensation for their appearances on social media. There is, however, a bill in committee that will focus on "Protecting the interests of minor children featured on for-profit family vlogs." This lack of protection has raised ethical concerns as to how child influencers will be protected in the future due to the fact that they participate in sponsored deals. Since children cannot legally operate social media accounts until the age of 13, their parents will do it for them. Parents will also take brand deals and sponsorships and will subject the children to advertise these sponsors, which the parents will take the money from sponsorships since the children do not know better. Since there are few laws protecting kid influencers this is legal. There is a push for laws such as the Coogan Act and the Fair Childs Labor Act of 1938 (FLSA) to protect child influencers as well.

=== California Child Protection Bill (Coogan Act) ===
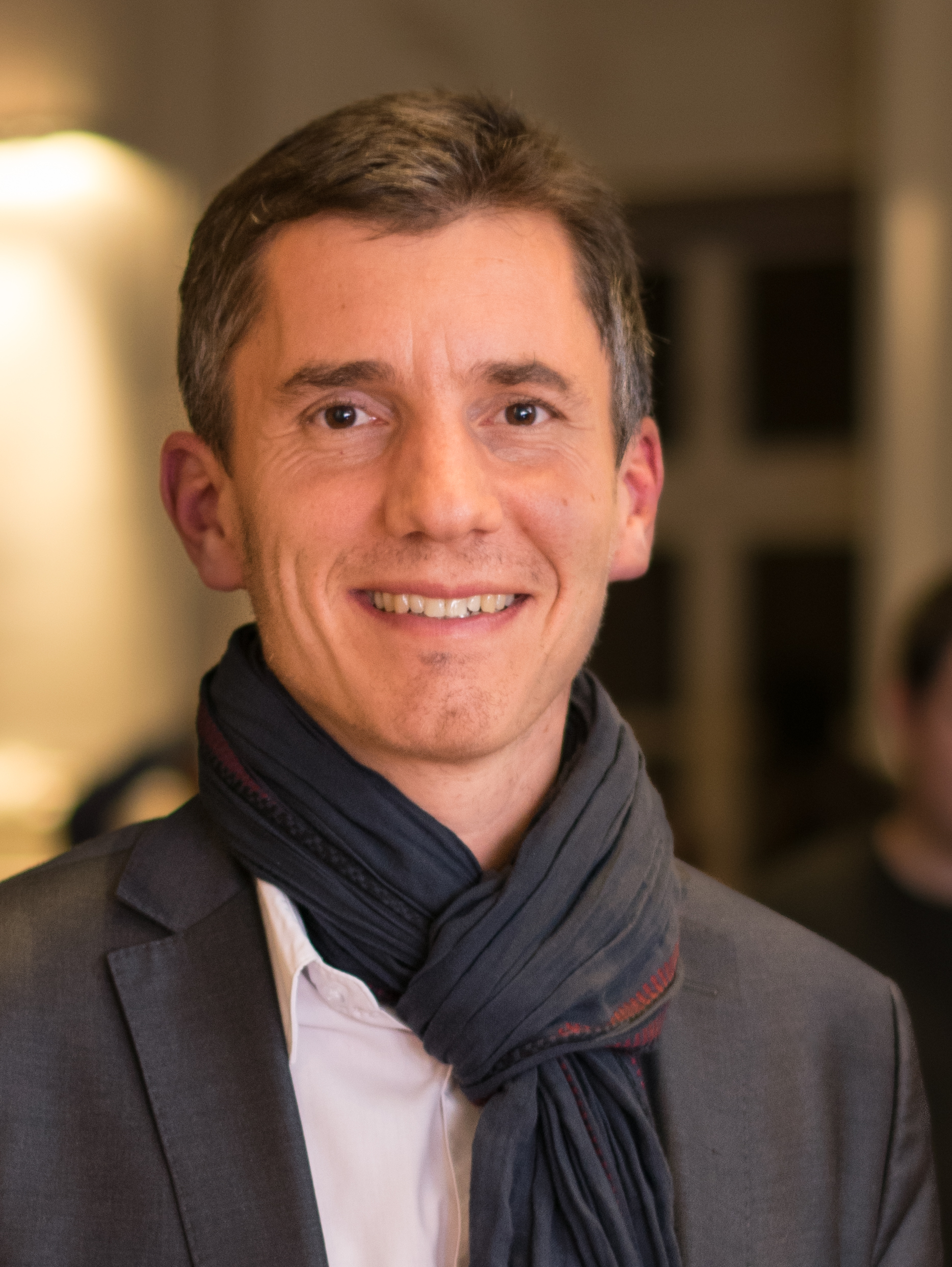
Bruno Studer, creator of the Studer Bill, which protects the monetary rights of kid influencers

The California Child Protection Bill, more commonly referred to as the Coogan Act, is a bill that requires that all money earned by children in the entertainment industry is their own. Their parents do not have control over the money. 15% of the money earned is placed in a Coogan Account which is a trust account made for the child's earnings. There has been a push for this bill to be reviewed to include protection for child influencers, and in September 2024, a law was passed in California that extends the Coogan Act legislation to child influencers. It requires that parents put a percentage of money made from online monetized content in a trust to be accessed by the child when they become an adult. Other states, such as New York, Louisiana, and New Mexico, also enforce the Coogan Act. However, not all of these states extend this to protect kid influencers.

=== Other US state laws protecting kid influencers ===
Two other U.S. states have passed laws regulating the revenues made by child influencers. Each of these have their own provisions that are similar to Coogan Act protections but not identical. A law in Illinois that went into effect July 2024 requires that children aged 16 and under be compensated for online content if they are in at least 30% of the content shared in a 30-day period. This law places responsibility on the parent or adult making the videos featuring a child to create a trust for the child's funds for them to access as an adult, and gives the child an avenue for legal action if a trust is not set aside for them. Another law was passed in Minnesota that goes into effect July 1, 2025 and requires that minors receive compensation for appearances in online content. It states that kids under the age of 14 receive 100% of the proceeds from that content, and also requires that content of a minor be deleted if or when the child makes the request.

=== France ===
France is the only country protecting child influencers by law. Bruno Studer, who is a French politician, has a bill that is in effect in France called the Studer Bill. This bill requires parents of child influencers to "apply for authorization before their child is allowed to appear in any monetized content and that money will be locked away in an account." This bill is a protective measure to ensure that child influencers will be properly compensated for the work they do.

The Studer Bill also outlines how parents must register monetized content through a formal authorization process. A percentage of the income generated by the child is transferred into a protected savings account, which cannot be accessed until the child reaches adulthood. Enforcement is carried out through France’s labor authorities, who may issue financial penalties or require content removal if parents fail to comply with the registration process.

== See also ==
- Toy unboxing
