= Renad Attallah =

Palestinian chef, activist, and influencer (born 2014)

- ريناد عطا الله
- Born: February 19, 2014 (age 12); Deir al-Balah, Gaza Strip, Palestine
- Occupations: Social media influencer, chef, activist

Renad Attallah (born February 19, 2014) is a Palestinian social media influencer, chef, and activist. She first gained international attention for creating cooking tutorials using ingredients from aid boxes during the first phases of the Gaza War. She has been described as a beacon of hope. As of late 2025, she had evacuated to Maastricht, the Netherlands.

== Biography ==
Attallah was born on February 19, 2014 in Deir al-Balah, central Gaza Strip. She has recounted watching her mother cook and helping out beginning when she was very little.

In March 2024, her older sister, Nourhan Attallah, posted a video of Renad opening a package of aid food on her personal social media. It reached more than a million views. They subsequently created a social media account for Renad, focusing on creating cooking videos using food from aid boxes and content unboxing aid boxes. In some of her early videos, bombs were heard in the background.

By November of that year, she had almost a million followers on social media. At that time, she stated that whenever she needed to be cheered up and forget the hardships of war, she looked at comments by her followers. She was described as a "beacon of hope" by Al Jazeera.

As her videos continued, food became more and more scarce as pockets of famine started to develop in the besieged enclave. In one notable video, she mashed cooked pasta to make bread. According to The Christian Science Monitor, she lost more than 10 pounds by September 2025. By June 2025, she largely stopped making cooking videos, focusing mostly on activism-focused videos with titles such as "We are being starved" and "Foods I haven't tasted in 5 months".

On August 27, 2025, she was evacuated from Gaza to Maastricht along with Nourhan, who began university at Maastricht University in Fall 2025. She was able to leave due to Nourhan being her caretaker. She announced her evacuation with a post simply stating "Goodbye", and three days later, a post stating that she was "a genocide survivor". She has since continued to produce social media content, and is learning Dutch at a school. She intends to release her own cookbook.

She is a youth ambassador for Human Concern International and collaborated with a fashion brand on her own collection, of which proceeds go towards donations to Gaza. As of 2026, she had more than 1.5 million followers on social media. Some notable recipes she created were called "war chips", "famine's bread", and "famine's Labneh".

She was featured in the 2025 BBC documentary Gaza: How to Survive a Warzone.
