= Vlad and Niki =

YouTube channel operated by Vashketov siblings

- Born: Vladislav Vashketov; February 26, 2013 (age 13); Miami, Florida, U.S. Nikita Vashketov; June 4, 2015 (age 11); Miami, Florida, U.S. Christian Vashketov; September 11, 2019 (age 7); Florida, U.S. Alice Vashketova; January 1, 2022 (age 4); Florida, U.S. Miami, Florida, United States
- Parents: Sergey Vashketov (father); Victoria Vashketova (mother)

YouTube information
- Channel: Vlad and Niki
- Years active: 2018–present
- Genres: Toy unboxing; Vlogging
- Subscribers: 151.2 million
- Views: 124.1 billion
- Last updated: 6 Nov 2026

Vlad and Niki is a YouTube channel featuring Russian–American siblings Vladislav "Vlad" Vashketov (born February 26, 2013), Nikita Vashketov (born June 4, 2015), Christian Vashketov (born September 11, 2019), and Alice Vashketova (born January 1, 2022). Sergey Vashketov and Victoria Vashketova, emigrated from Moscow, Russia and run 21 YouTube channels in 18 languages. The kids reside in Miami and occasionally in Dubai. Vlad & Niki is the 7th most-viewed and 5th most-subscribed YouTube channel in the world.

== Parent career ==
Vlad and Niki's parents, Sergey and Victoria, each had different careers. Sergey worked in sales, while Victoria was a homemaker and a former gymnast.

== History ==
Vlad and Nikita started their YouTube channel on April 23, 2018, prompting their father to quit his sales job to help with brands and licensing based on "Vlad Crazyshow" (stylized as "Joker"). Their videos include roleplays, vlogging, and advertising. The channel signed a representation deal with Haven Global, an Australian-based licensing agency, to develop new content, consumer products, and licenses for mobile apps under their brand. They also signed a deal with Playmates Toys, a Hong Kong–based manufacturer, to produce toys under their brand. In 2019, the brothers were judged to be the YouTubers making the most money per video at an estimated US$312,000 per video. As of December, 2026, they had 151 million subscribers.
