= Unboxing =

Uploaded video of products being unpacked

An unboxing of a Moog Etherwave theremin

Unboxing is the process of unpacking consumer products, especially high-tech gadgets, as recorded on video and shared online. It is the visual documentation of the out-of-box experience. The video typically includes a detailed description and demonstration of the product.

The first unboxing video, featuring a Nokia E61 cellphone, appeared in 2006, and searches for the term "unboxing" began to surface later that year, according to Google Trends. Initially, unboxing videos focused primarily on gadgets and fashion items. However, as the trend gained popularity, unboxing videos were available for almost all products available for purchase. By 2014, some companies were known to upload unboxing videos for their own products, while others sent products to content creators for free.

Some people believe that the popularity of unboxing videos is due to the ability to provide an authentic look at the product without any manipulative advertising. By seeing what the customer is getting, they can make more informed purchasing decisions. Some creators also add special effects or create unboxings in unique ways, such as underwater unboxings of waterproof smartphones.

Renad Attallah's unboxing videos are of humanitarian aid boxes.

The growth of e-commerce has been a major contributing factor to the rise of unboxing. Direct-to-consumer companies have sought ways to create a positive buying experience and better connect with their customers emotionally. Investing in packaging design has become a marketing asset for their products, as engaging and cool packaging is more likely to inspire customers to record unboxing videos, thereby driving more buyers to the company. Packaging manufacturers are also increasingly aware of the role that the unboxing trend plays in the development of products, continually improving their technologies to meet the demand for higher quality printed packages. As such, boxes are no longer just a transportation tool and container; they have become valuable marketing billboards that are directly delivered to customers.

== Advertising ==
In 2016, international fast food chain store Burger King debuted a commercial featuring Frito-Lay mascot Chester Cheetah unboxing Mac n' Cheetos.

== See also ==
- Haul video, videos with the related premise of showcasing and discussing recent purchases
- Toy unboxing, subgenre of unboxing videos
