= Anthony Levatino =

American pro-life obstetrician

Anthony Levatino is an American obstetrician/gynecologist. He formerly served as a professor and Student and Residency program director at Albany Medical Center.

== Biography ==
Dr. Anthony Levatino, M.D./J.D. graduated with a Doctor of Medicine degree from Albany Medical College in 1976. In 1993, Dr. Anthony Levatino earned his Juris Doctor degree from Albany Law School in Albany, New York. He served seven years on the faculty of the Albany Medical College, where he taught medical students and medical residents obstetrics and gynecology.

Levatino and his wife attempted to conceive a child without success, and they consequently adopted a young girl, Heather. During the adoption process, Levatino's wife became pregnant with a baby boy. After the family adopted Heather, Levatino continued to perform abortions. Two months prior to Heather's sixth birthday, she was struck and killed by a car. After this event, Levatino had difficulty performing abortions.

For the first time in my career after all those years and all those abortions, I looked… I really looked at that pile of body parts on the side of the table... And I didn't see her wonderful right to choose and I didn't see what a great doctor I was helping her with her problem, and I didn't even see the $800 cash I just made in 15 minutes. All I could see was somebody's son or daughter.

— Dr. Anthony Levatino

He stopped doing second and third trimester abortions and eventually stopped them completely. In his career, he performed over 1,200 abortions. He is currently a faculty member at Burrell College of Osteopathic Medicine.

He has testified before Congress as an expert witness. There are numerous interviews of his testimony and is now actively involved in prolife advocacy.
