= Toy unboxing =

Uploaded video of toys being unpacked

A quarter of toy unboxing videos feature a toy being assembled such as this Lego Saturn V

Toy unboxing is a subgenre of unboxing videos in which children or adults upload videos of themselves unpacking commercial toy products. The videos may feature the toys being played with, assembled and/or reviewed. Children who make this content are known as kid influencers.

== History ==
Since 2013, the most common subject of unboxing videos has been toy unboxing. Tanya Basu of Mental Floss stated that creators of unboxing videos were "notoriously difficult to reach and private". The highest earning YouTuber of 2014 was adult unboxing creator DisneyCollectorBR who The New York Times reported was a 21-year-old Brazilian named Melissa Lima living in Westchester County, New York. Lima's channel, renamed to FunToyzCollector, became the third most viewed on YouTube in 2015 with more than 8 billion views and an estimated advertising revenue between $2 million and $13 million a year.

Evan from EvanTubeHD, who started making videos with Angry Birds toys when he was five, was one of the first children to become an "unboxing celebrity". The Guardian reported that twenty of the top one hundred most viewed channels on YouTube in March 2016 made toy-related content with Ryan ToysReview, Disney Car Toys Club, FunToyzCollector, Toy Monster, Toys and Funny Kids Surprise Eggs, CookieSwirlC, Blu Toys, Hobby Kids TV and Disney Car Toys being in the top 50. The most viewed toy related channel was Ryan ToysReview which had received more than 645 million views in March 2016 making it the second most viewed YouTube channel in that month after Justin Bieber. Ryan Kaji of Ryan ToysReview started making videos at the age of four in 2015 and would become the highest paid YouTuber of 2018, mainly due to partnerships with toy companies and him receiving his own TV show. The 2020s saw the increase in popularity of Russian-American channels Vlad and Niki and Like Nastya and Ukrainian-American channel Kids Diana Show who according to R.T. Watson of The Wall Street Journal "leaned into [the] formula" created by EvanTubeHD and Ryan Kaji.

== Content ==
According to Stuart Dredge of The Guardian, Disney and Lego products are some of the most reviewed on popular toy channels and so they were unlikely to be critical of the trend.

In 2018, researchers at the University of Melbourne found that in the 100 videos they looked at, 82% featured blind boxes, 58% featured multiple toys, and 69% of the toys were from franchises such as Marvel and Star Wars as opposed to toy companies such as Lego. 30% of videos featured toys being played with, 25% of videos featured toys being assembled and 10% of videos featured toys being reviewed, with the majority featuring a toy unboxing and what the study described as "little else". In terms of people featured, the study found that 47% featured adults, 45% featured children and 8% featured both, of which 94% of the adults and 47% of the children were "disembodied" meaning they were primarily recorded from an anonymous first-person perspective. Additionally, 24% of the videos featuring children included their friends or siblings. In terms of gender, the research found that 36% of children were female, 52% were male, 28% of adults were female and 51% were male with the remainder being undetermined due to disembodied videos featuring only their hands and no commentary. In terms of the age of the children featured, the researchers discerned that 17% were 2 to 4 years old, 74% were 4 to 11 years old and 9% were 12 to 18 years old.

== Effects ==
In 2018, The Guardian reported on a Los Angeles summer camp called LA Star Education which taught children how to become YouTubers by making toy unboxing videos. Lois M. Collins of Deseret News described unboxing as one of the "most powerful" forms of advertising in 2022 and cited assistant and associate professors of communication Jason Freeman and Frank E. Dardis who stated that when the target was kids, child influencers had "enormous persuasive power" becoming like "beloved friends". The communication professors added that children may not understand that child influencers such as Ryan Kaji, who are earning money by playing with toys, are being provided toys for free by companies so that they can promote them.

== See also ==
- YouTube Kids – Family-friendly version of YouTube
- Elsagate – Controversy concerning a genre of YouTube videos, some of which included toy unboxing channels
