= Chester Cheetah =

Animal mascot of Cheetos

- First appearance: 1986; 40 years ago
- Voiced by: Joel Murray (1986–1997); Pete Stacker (1997–2000); Johnny Michaels (5 spots; early 2000s); Christopher Murney (2006); Adam Leadbeater (2008–2017); Max Koch (2017–present)

In-universe information
- Species: Cheetah
- Occupation: Mascot of Cheetos

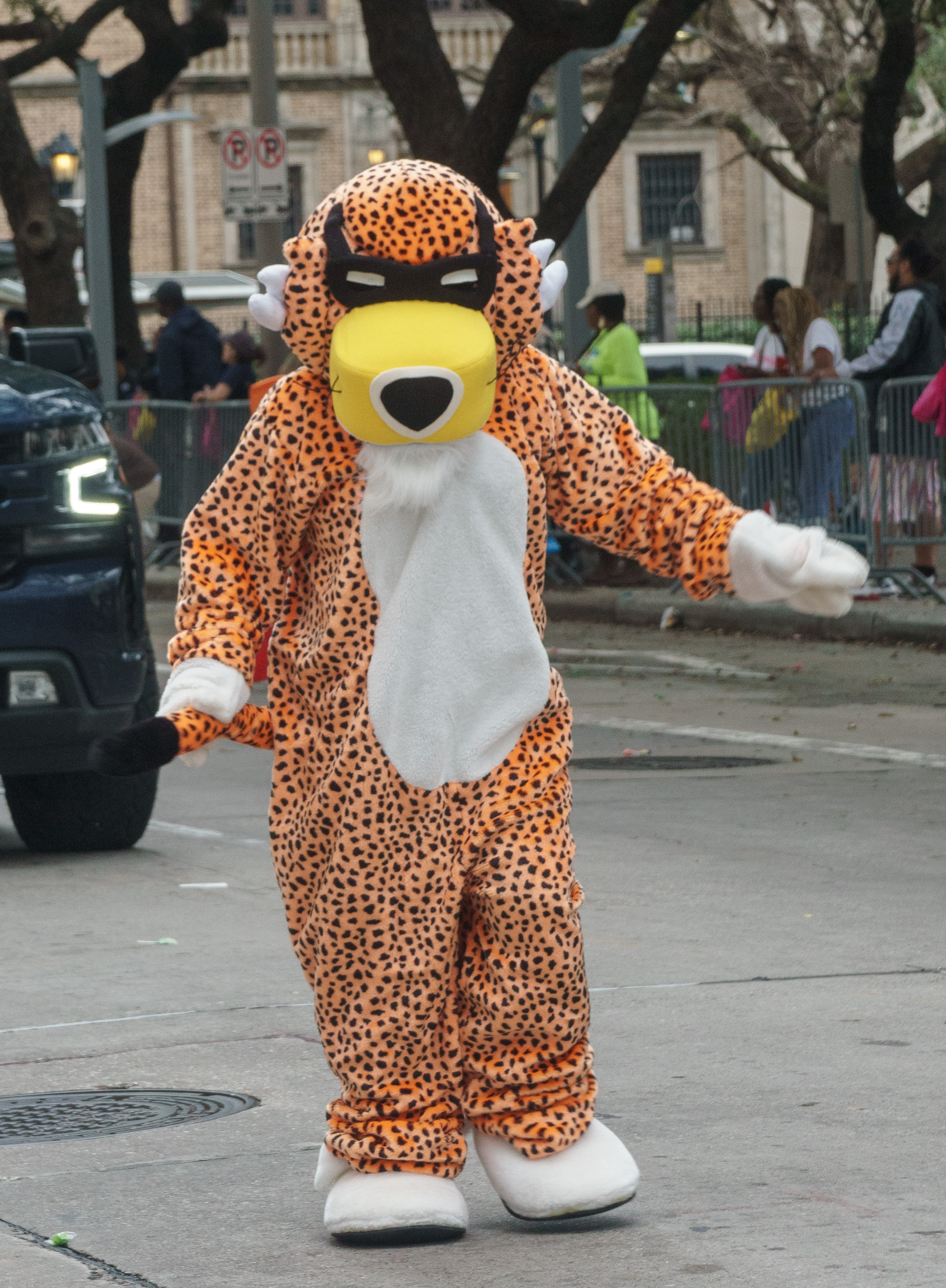
Cosplay of Chester Cheetah

Chester Cheetah is a fictional character and the official mascot for Frito-Lay's Cheetos brand snacks as well as Chester's Snacks which consists of flavored fries, popcorn and puffcorn.

== History ==
=== 1986–2003: Traditional animation ===
Cheetos' original mascot was the Cheetos Mouse, who debuted in 1971 and disappeared around 1979. In 1986 Chester Cheetah was created by Brad Morgan, who art directed the commercials and designed the character, and Stephen Kane who wrote the original scripts for television commercials. The original 24-frame animation was done by Richard Williams. After Chester's introduction, the sly, smooth voiced cheetah began starring in more commercials and eventually became Cheetos' official mascot. He used the slogans "It's not easy being cheesy" and "The cheese that goes crunch!" from 1986 to 1997, until it became "Dangerously cheesy!" from 1997 onward.

From the mid-1980s to the early 2000s, television adverts often featured Chester's desperate attempts to eat other people's Cheetos. The self-described "hip kitty" would often speak in rhyme and sneak up on an unsuspecting stranger at a beach or public park. The result would always involve cartoon violence in the vein of Looney Tunes, such as Chester riding a motorcycle off a bridge, getting thrown to the top of a coliseum, or plunging miles through the air to unwittingly grab a hang-gliding bodacious babe, only to cast her aside in favor of Cheetos. These spots were first directed by Keith Van Allen and later by Cow and Chicken creator David Feiss.

In 1992, Chester's own television program called Yo! It's the Chester Cheetah Show! was under development for the Fox Kids Saturday morning fall lineup. However, an ethics debate erupted over Chester's status as an advertising character, and likely due to the protests of Action for Children's Television, the show was prevented from airing. Their petition marked the first time that the organization protested something before it actually became a program.

Chester's character underwent slight revamping in 1997. With the introduction of the "Dangerously cheesy!" slogan and Pete Stacker replacing Joel Murray as his voice actor. Chester began appearing in live-action/animated hybrid advertisements where he entered the real world. During this time, the ads began portraying him in a less antagonistic manner; he went from being bumbling to suave, and unlike in the older commercials, he actually managed to eat Cheetos.

=== 2003–2009: Jump to CGI ===
In the United States in 2003, Chester was rendered as a computer generated character, but he continued to appear in his old animation style in other countries.

In one specific 2006 commercial series, Chester emerged victorious over competitor Chef Pierre in a baking competition to develop Baked Cheetos. This resulted in an advertising campaign called Chester Goes Undercover, wherein Pierre steals the Baked Cheetos formula while wearing a shadow, and Chester pursues him by tracking down hints that point him in the direction of Pierre's goons, Twisty McGee, Flamin' Hot Fiona, and The Cruncher. When Chester confronted Chef Pierre, he gave the order for his operatives to show up, capture Pierre and his henchmen, and retrieve the stolen formula. There was an interactive web campaign associated with these commercials.

=== 2008–present: OrangeUnderground redesign ===
By 2008, Cheetos took aim at an adult demographic with a series of ads featuring the mascot in promotion of OrangeUnderground.com. In this incarnation, Chester (originally a puppet) is computer generated, but now with photorealistic textures/detail; he speaks with a British-sounding Mid-Atlantic accent and encourages people to use their Cheetos in acts of revenge or to solve problems (e.g. plug the nostrils of a snoring man or dirty the cubicle of a neat freak), sometimes referring to himself as "Papa Chester". In this incarnation, Chester is voiced by Adam Leadbeater.

== Merchandise ==
Chester starred in two video games produced by Kaneko for the Sega Genesis and Super NES: Chester Cheetah: Too Cool to Fool in 1992 and Chester Cheetah: Wild Wild Quest in 1993.

Chester Cheetah makes a cameo appearance in Archie Comics' Sonic the Hedgehog series.

The Angry Birds Cheetos and Angry Birds Cheetos 2 Facebook games were released in 2012 and 2013. With the exception of the addition of a new Cheetos bag power up in both games, the games are quite identical to past Angry Birds versions. A normal Cheetos bag that behaves like the Blue bird and splits into many Cheetos is added in the first game, and a flaming hot Cheetos bag that behaves like the Bomb bird and explodes on impact is added in the sequel.

A promotional plush doll was produced, featuring dark sunglasses and lace-up shoes. It was 18" tall. A 10" doll is still available today.

In 2023, the company Jada Toys released an action figure of Chester Cheetah.

== Video games ==
Chester Cheetah: Too Cool to Fool
- Developer: System Vision
- Publisher: Kaneko USA
- Platforms: Super NES, Sega Genesis
- Release: Super NES: NA: December 1992; Genesis: NA: January 1993
- Genre: Platform
- Mode: Single-player

Reception

Review scores
Publication	Score
Consoles +	SNES: 77%
Electronic Gaming Monthly	SNES: 31/40
Electronic Games	SNES: 82%

=== Chester Cheetah: Too Cool to Fool ===
Chester Cheetah: Too Cool to Fool is a 1992 video game that starred Cheetos mascot Chester Cheetah, only released in North America.

The game is composed of simple side-scrolling platform levels. On each level there is a hidden "scooter" part. In game, Chester can dash and stun enemies by jumping on their heads.

The instruction manual contains a popular Engrish recognized by many gamers: "As is Chester Cheetah way, is one-person play." The Engrish spawned due to bad translations and an attempt to rhyme in anapestic tetrameter like Dr. Seuss. No actual mention of the Cheetos snack food is made in the game, but Chester's health points are represented as Cheetos Paws.

Time Extension listed Too Cool to Fool as one of the worst SNES games.

=== Chester Cheetah: Wild Wild Quest ===
Chester Cheetah: Wild Wild Quest
- Developer: Kaneko
- Publisher: Kaneko USA
- Platforms: Sega Genesis, Super NES
- Release: Genesis: NA: January 1994; Super NES: NA: March 1994
- Genre: Platform
- Mode: Single player

Chester Cheetah: Wild Wild Quest is a 1994 video game by Kaneko for the Super NES and Sega Genesis. The game stars Cheetos mascot Chester Cheetah and is the sequel to Chester Cheetah: Too Cool to Fool.

The player dies in one hit unless they have a cheese puff on hand. Collecting 100 paws per level results in a new continue, and there are three difficulty levels. Some stages involve controlling vehicles, like a car or a motorcycle.

The game was shown at the Consumer Electronics Show in Las Vegas in 1994.

After breaking out of a zoo, Chester Cheetah is going to Hip City when Mean Eugene tears up his map into 10 pieces and scatters it across the United States. Chester Cheetah must then travel across America to recover the map. Chester visits fictional cities in states such as Nebraska, California, Florida, Arkansas, and Alaska.

The game was released only in America.

Both the Genesis and SNES versions of the game received mixed reviews. Electronic Gaming Monthly reviewed both the versions. They gave the SNES version a score of 28 out of 50, and the Genesis version 24 out of 40. The reviewers praised the graphics and animations but cited poor control as a negative.

Sega Visions gave it a score of 12 out of 20, and gave it strong score for sound and music.

Nintendo Power reviewed the SNES version and stated it had stiff controls, low challenge, but had good audio and graphics. They gave it an average score of 3.3/5.

GamePro magazine called it "High on the list of unnecessary sequels" and said "like the cheese puffs themselves, Chester might sound like a tempting idea, but you'll get no nourishment and you'll soon be hungry again".

=== Just Dance 4 ===
Chester Cheetah made a cameo appearance in the background of the redeemable version of the song "You Make Me Feel..." by dance-rock band Cobra Starship featuring American singer Sabi featured on the Just Dance 4 video game. The track could be unlocked with a code found in a Cheetos bag, having exclusive traits on its background like a throne, and Chester Cheetah appearing sometimes on the back pillars and dancing along with the coach. Since the offer expired, the map became available as a downloadable track for all consoles in all regions, however, without the special characteristics, equivalent to following games said map is featured in, such as Just Dance Now and Just Dance Unlimited. Along with the redeemable version, a commercial was released to promote it.

== Health concerns and legal status across countries ==
Chester Cheetah, as well as other mascots featured in products targeted to children (such as Kellogg’s Tony the Tiger and Toucan Sam), has been the subject of controversy in several countries. A study published in the journal Obesity Reviews, suggested familiar media character branding appeared to be "a powerful influence on children's preferences, choices and intake of less healthy foods." Chester and similar mascots, have been banned from being featured in packaging and advertising in countries like Chile, Peru, Argentina and Mexico. A study by a coalition that included Action on Sugar and Children's Food Campaign in the UK, found that 51% of 526 assessed "child-friendly" food and drink products with popular cartoon characters on their packaging were high in sugar, saturated fat, salt and fat, with only 18 healthy products such as fruit, vegetables and water were found to use child-friendly cartoons. Tom Watson of the Labour Party said using playful characters to appeal to children is “grossly irresponsible”, and the Health and Social Care Select Committee issued calls for a blanket ban on ‘brand-generated characters or licensed TV and film characters which are used to promote foods high in fat, sugar or salt." Consumption of sugar-sweetened drinks dropped 25 percent in the 18 months after Chile adopted these regulations, which also included octagon front-of-package warning labels and a ban on junk food in schools.

== See also ==
- Frito Bandito
- Tony the Tiger
