= List of notable YouTube videos =

YouTube logo

YouTube is an American online video sharing platform owned by Google. YouTube was founded by Chad Hurley, Jawed Karim, and Steve Chen, three former employees of PayPal. It is the second-most-visited website. Most content is generated by individuals, including collaborations between YouTubers and corporate sponsors. Established media, news, and entertainment corporations have also created and expanded their visibility on YouTube channels to reach bigger audiences. In January 2012, it was estimated that visitors to YouTube spent an average of 15 minutes a day on the site, in contrast to the four or five hours a day spent by a typical US citizen watching television. In 2017, viewers on average watched YouTube on mobile devices for more than an hour every day.

YouTube was created on February 14, 2005, with the first video being published on April 23, 2005, with Me at the zoo. As of May 2019, videos were being uploaded to the platform at a rate of more than 500 hours of content per minute, and as of mid-2024, there were approximately 14.8 billion videos in total. According to Amanda Holpuch of The New York Times, "YouTube is now a cornerstone of the media ecosystem." Content on the platform ranges from music videos, long-form documentary-style video essays, and conspiracy theory videos. Holpuch goes on to say "It has disrupted traditional television and given rise to a world of video creators who make content catering to every imaginable niche interest."

This is a list of YouTube videos that journalists, online newspaper, or magazines have written about. To be considered for this list: the videos must be included on many separate articles from different publications (inclusive of all time periods), as chosen by their editorial staff. Each video must be recognised mainly for its corresponding YouTube upload, and already has an article on Wikipedia.

== See also ==
- List of most-viewed YouTube videos
- List of viral videos
