= Multivision =

Multivision or Multivisión may mean any of the following:

- Multivisión (Cuba), Cuba's fifth national television channel
- Multivision (Sri Lanka), a pay TV provider in Sri Lanka
- Multivision Plus (Indonesia), a movie production house in Indonesia
- Multivision (television technology), a late 1980s technology that enabled picture-in-picture display on older TVs
- MVS Multivisión, a cable provider in Mexico later known as MASTV and now defunct
- Multivisión (Bolivia), a Bolivian subscription TV company later acquired by Tigo
