= My Snowboarding Skillz =

Second video uploaded to YouTube

- Thumbnail of the video
- Produced by: mw
- Release date: April 23, 2005
- Running time: 11 seconds
- Country: United States
- Language: English

"My Snowboarding Skillz" is a YouTube video uploaded shortly after the creation of "Me at the zoo" on April 23, 2005, recognized as the second video uploaded to the platform and the platform's first "fail video". The 11-second video features "mw" attempting to traverse a ramp or box feature, but ultimately fails at the end. As of November 2025, the video has received more than 6.1 million views.

== Background ==
After the release of YouTube, "Me at the zoo" was uploaded by Jawed Karim as the first YouTube video. Shortly after, "My Snowboarding Skillz" was uploaded by a user known as "mw" as the second YouTube video. It is considered YouTube's first "fail video". He has never been identified; archived versions of his user page indicate a birthdate in 1974 or 1975.

== Release ==
"My Snowboarding Skillz" was uploaded on April 23, 2005, 25 minutes after “Me at the zoo” at 8:51 (UTC-7) p.m. It shows “mw” outside in the snow, getting ready to show his snowboarding skills before losing balance 4.3 seconds into the video, crashing into the snow at the 5-second mark, while his snowboard completes the journey across the platform. He begins to stand up at 6.6 seconds and is fully upright by 10 seconds.
