= Online video platform =

Platform for users to upload, share, or live stream videos on the Internet

An online video platform (OVP) enables users to upload, convert, store, and play back video content on the Internet, often via a private server structured, large-scale system that may generate revenue. Users will generally upload video content via the hosting service's website, mobile or desktop application, or other interfaces (API), and typically provide embedded codes or links that allow others to view the video content.

== Description ==
Online video platforms can use a software as a service (SaaS) business model, a do it yourself (DIY) model, or user-generated content (UGC) model. The OVP comes with an end-to-end tool set to upload, encode, manage, playback, style, deliver, distribute, download, publish and measure quality of service or audience engagement quality of experience of online video content for both video on demand (VOD) and live delivery. This is usually manifested as a User Interface with login credentials. OVPs also include providing a custom video player or a third-party video player that can be embedded in a website. Modern online video platforms are often coupled up with embedded online video analytics providing video publishers with detailed insights into video performance: the total number of video views, impressions, and unique views; video watch time, stats on user location, visits, and behavior on the site. Video heat maps show how user engagement rate changes through the viewing process in order to measure audience interaction and to create compelling video content. OVPs are related to the over-the-top content video industry, although there are many OVP providers that are also present in broadcast markets, serving video on demand set-top boxes.

OVP product models vary in scale and feature-set, ranging from ready-made websites that individuals, can use to white label models that can be customized by enterprise clients or media/content aggregators and integrated with their traditional broadcast workflows. The former example is YouTube. The latter example is predominantly found in FTA (Free-To-Air) or pay-TV broadcasters who seek to provide an over-the-top media service (OTT) that extends the availability of their content on desktops or multiple mobility devices.

In general, the graphical user interface accessed by users of the OVP is sold as a service. Revenue is derived from monthly subscriptions based on the number of users it is licensed to and the complexity of the workflow. Some workflows require encryption of content with DRM and this increases the cost of using the service. Videos may be transcoded from their original source format or resolution to a mezzanine format (suitable for management and mass-delivery), either on-site or using cloud computing. The latter would be where platform as a service, is provided as an additional cost.

It is feasible, but rare, for large broadcasters to develop their own proprietary OVP. However, this can require complex development and maintenance costs and diverts attention to 'building' as opposed to distributing/curating content.

OVPs often cooperate with specialized third-party service providers, using what they call an application programming interface (API). These include cloud transcoders, recommendation engines, search engines, metadata libraries, and analytics providers.

== Video and content delivery protocols ==
The vast majority of OVPs use industry-standard HTTP streaming or HTTP progressive download protocols. With HTTP streaming, the de facto standard is to use adaptive streaming where multiple files of a video are created at different bit rates, but only one of these is sent to the end-user during playback, depending on available bandwidth or device CPU constraints. This can be switched dynamically and near-seamlessly at any time during the video viewing. The main protocols for adaptive HTTP streaming include Smooth Streaming (by Microsoft), HTTP Live Streaming (HLS) (by Apple) and Flash Video (by Adobe). Flash is still in use but is declining due to the popularity of HLS and Smooth Stream in mobile devices and desktops, respectively. Each is a proprietary protocol in its own right and due to this fragmentation, there have been efforts to create one standardized protocol known as MPEG-DASH.

There are many OVPs available on the Internet.

== Influence ==
In the 2010s, with the increasing prevalence of technology and the Internet in everyday life, video hosting services serve as a portal to different forms of entertainment (comedy, shows, games, or music), news, documentaries and educational videos. Content may be either both user-generated, amateur clips, or commercial products. The entertainment industry uses this medium to release music and videos, films, and television shows directly to the public. Since many users do not have unlimited web space, either as a paid service, or through an ISP offering, video hosting services are becoming increasingly popular, especially with the explosion in popularity of blogs, internet forums and other interactive pages. The mass market for camera phones and smartphones has increased the supply of user-generated video. Traditional methods of personal video distribution, such as making a DVD to show to friends at home, are unsuited to the low resolution and high volume of camera phone clips. In contrast, current broadband Internet connections are well suited to serving the quality of video shot on mobile phones. Most people do not own web servers, and this has created demand for user-generated video content hosting.

== Copyright issues ==
On some websites, users share entire films by breaking them up into segments that are about the size of the video length limit imposed by the site (e.g., 15 minutes). An emerging practice is for users to obfuscate the titles of feature-length films that they share by providing a title that is recognizable by humans but will not match on standard search engines. It is not even in all cases obvious to the user if a provided video is a copyright infringement.

== History ==
Practical online video hosting and video streaming was made possible by advances in video compression, due to the impractically high bandwidth requirements of uncompressed video. Raw uncompressed digital video has a bit rate of 168 Mbit/s for SD video, and over 1 Gbit/s for full HD video. The most important data compression algorithm that enabled practical video hosting and streaming is the discrete cosine transform (DCT), a lossy compression technique first proposed by Nasir Ahmed, T. Natarajan and K. R. Rao in 1973. The DCT algorithm is the basis for the first practical video coding format, H.261, in 1988. It was followed by more popular DCT-based video coding formats, most notably the MPEG and H.26x video standards from 1991 onwards. The modified discrete cosine transform (MDCT) is also the basis for the MP3 audio compression format introduced in 1994, and later the Advanced Audio Coding (AAC) format in 1999.

=== Video hosting sites ===
The first Internet video hosting site was ShareYourWorld.com. Founded in 1997, it allowed users to upload clips or full videos in different file formats. However, Internet access bandwidth and video transcoding technology at the time were limited, so the site did not support video streaming like YouTube later did. ShareYourWorld was founded by Chase Norlin, and it ran until 2001, when it closed due to budget and bandwidth problems.

Founded in October 2004, Pandora TV from South Korea is the first video sharing website in the world to attach advertisements to user-submitted video clips and to provide unlimited storage space for users to upload their own clips. The company has developed an auto-advertisements system that automatically inserts advertising to the clips posted to the website. It was founded in the Gangnam District of Seoul.

=== Video streaming platforms ===
YouTube logo used since 2024. Owned by Google, it is the largest video sharing platform, with 2.7 billion monthly active users.

YouTube was founded by Chad Hurley, Jawed Karim and Steve Chen in 2005. It was based on video transcoding technology, which enabled the video streaming of user-generated content from anywhere on the World Wide Web. This was made possible by implementing a Flash player based on MPEG-4 AVC video with AAC audio. This allowed any video coding format to be uploaded, and then transcoded into Flash-compatible AVC video that can be directly streamed from anywhere on the Web. The first YouTube video clip was Me at the zoo, uploaded by Karim in April 2005.

YouTube subsequently became the most popular online video platform, and changed the way videos were hosted on the Web. The success of YouTube led to a number of similar online video streaming platforms, from companies such as Netflix, Hulu and Crunchyroll.

Within these video streaming platforms like Netflix, Hulu, and YouTube, there are privacy concerns about how the websites use consumers' personal information and online behaviors to advertise and track spending. Many video streaming websites record semi-private consumer information such as video streaming data, purchase frequency, genre of videos watched, etc.

== See also ==
- List of online video platforms
- Online video analytics
- Streaming media
