= MixBit =

Video sharing service

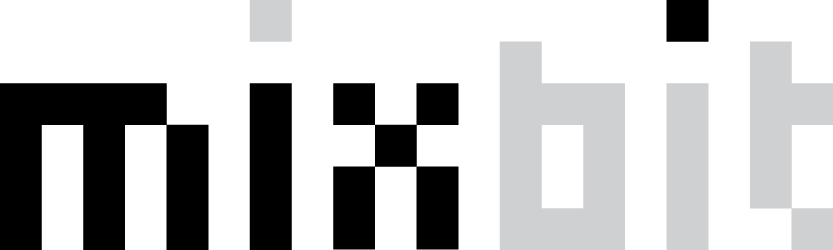
- Original authors: Steve Chen; Chad Hurley
- Developers: MixBit, Inc.
- Release: August 8, 2013; 13 years ago
- Operating system: iOS, Android
- Type: Video sharing
- License: Freeware
- Website: mixbit.com

MixBit was a video sharing service created by Steve Chen and Chad Hurley, two of the co-founders of YouTube. It was released on August 8, 2013. MixBit let users create dynamic shared videos, and competed with Vine (owned by Twitter) and Instagram (owned by Facebook) in the video sharing website market. Its iPhone app was released in August 2013 and its Android app followed two months later. MixBit ceased operations on August 21, 2018.

== AVOS Systems ==
AVOS Systems was an Internet company founded by Chad Hurley, Steve Chen, and Vijay Karunamurthy. In April 2011, it was announced that AVOS purchased Delicious, with the transition occurring in June 2011. In May 2011, AVOS purchased the social analytics company Tap 11. In May 2014, AVOS sold Delicious to Science Inc.

In 2012, AVOS launched Zeen, a web curation service allowing users to create video magazines, based on the word "zine." AVOS shut Zeen down in 2013. In 2014 AVOS transformed from an incubator into a single company working only on MixBit.

MixBit later became part of InvoiceOwl.
