= YouTube Comedy Week =

Event on YouTube

- Genre: Comedy festival
- Location: California
- Years active: 2013
- Founded: 2013

YouTube Comedy Week was an event on YouTube, and produced by Jash in the US and ChannelFlip in the UK. Comedy week was an event that ran from May 19–25, 2013, and brought "the best of UK and US talent together on YouTube." This was the first of a planned annual YouTube Comedy Week.

The Big Live Comedy Show began the event, was hosted by Kyle Mooney, and was opened by Sarah Silverman and Seth Rogen. This was stage show that was broadcast live.

== Announcement ==
Arnold Schwarzenegger was featured in a video that promoted Comedy Week, and earned over 3.8 million views in one week.

Following YouTube's announcement of the event, several news publications reported about the event.

Tubefilter reported that YouTube had "hyped" the Comedy Week event with television advertisements.

== Reception ==
=== Commercial ===
As of July 10, 2013, The Big Live Comedy Show has garnered nearly 1 million video views and has approximately 73% likes on its YouTube rating. Other videos uploaded by YouTube during Comedy Week, struggled to get past 250,000 views (as of July 10, 2013). However, the Gregory Brothers' The History of YouTube earned over 2 million video views (as of July 10, 2013).

=== Critical reception ===
Schwarzenegger's promotional video, Ryan Higa's Google Glass Human, and the Fine Brothers' YouTubers React to Try to Watch This Without Laughing or Grinning were met with positive reception and called the "winners" of Comedy Week. However, due to Higa and the YouTubers React series having established success on YouTube, and Schwarzenegger's video being uploaded as a promotional video rather than a comedy one during the event, the overall event was met with mixed reviews by Adweek and other publications alike.

The performers and entertainers involved in the event featured a mixture of traditional and new media stars and personalities. The comedy show was met with negative to mixed reception, as the particular mixture of new and traditional media was criticized, as most traditional media stars were reported to seemingly not care about YouTube or its Comedy Week event. The performances by YouTube personalities were met with better reception than those of mainstream media stars.
