= Multivisión (Bolivia) =

Defunct Bolivian subscription television company

Multivisión was a Bolivian subscription television company, a subsidiary of the Vancouver-based Multivision Communications Corp., operating an MMDS cable television service since 1991, which could distribute audio and video signals over the air to homes without the need to build and maintain coaxial cable networks. It provided subscription television services in the cities of Santa Cruz, La Paz, Cochabamba and Tarija. The parent company was founded in 1987 and was headquartered in Vancouver, Canada. In 2013, the company was purchased by Tigo in its entirety, thus making the users and employees part of TigoStar, now Tigo TV.

== History ==
The parent company that acquired the Bolivian operator in 1996 was established in Vancouver, where it was incorporated under the British Columbia Business Corporations Act on May 14, 1987.

It started operating in April 1991 in Santa Cruz de la Sierra and expanded in 1992 to La Paz and Cochabamba. It was the first company to offer subscription television services before the departmental telecommunications co-operatives started theirs (COTAS being the first in 1999). In 1995, the company was capitalized (Multivisión S.A.) and Altaf Nazerali took control the following year. In April 1996, under Nazerali, the Canadian company acquired Multivisión Bolivia, the largest wireless cable television operator in Bolivia at the time, having also gained licenses for the cities of Puerto Suárez and Puerto Quijarro in the country's southeast.

In September 1996, it acquired the assets of Multivisión Sucre S.R.L. and TeleVideo Codificado in La Paz. By 1997, it was the first MMDS operator in the world to offer 60 channels. Most systems at the time had a maximum capacity of 30 to 35 channels. The new 60-channel service was named Multivisión Plus and was the result of a US$4 million investment undertaken by the company to improve its infrastructure. In July, it announced the acquisition of Telecine S.R.L. in Tarija. The operator started carrying HTV in December 1998, up until then, it was the only country without the channel. On May 25, 2000, it won the MAYA Award in La Paz for the quality of its customer service.

Each city in the trunk axis (Santa Cruz, La Paz, Cochabamba) was equipped by a transmitter capable to receive 60 to 65 channels, while Sucre and Tarija still had a reduced 30-35 channel service.

The company joined LaNet (Latin American Networking) in January 2001, a pooling of several MMDS operators in Latin America. In August 2001, regulator Sittel enabled Multivisión to start operating two-way wireless networks using its infrastructure to include new services: digital television, broadband internet and two-day data services for companies and existing TV subscribers. It also planned the start of its TV and internet services in Trinidad, Oruro and Potosí, ahead of the liberalization of the telecommunications sector from late November. In December 2002 it started offering internet services provided by Entel in La Paz and El Alto. Some of its head-ends carried sporting events, in La Paz it carried the qualifiers for the 2006 FIFA World Cup. Other events were carried on all systems, such as a friendly match between Bolivia and Mexico two weeks ahead of the start of the 2002 FIFA World Cup. Sporting events (mainly soccer matches) were carried on the guide channel.

On July 11, 2007, it installed cable services to child and elderly care houses part of SEDEGES La Paz, with the first location to benefit from the service being Instituto Departamental de Adaptación Infantil.

In July 2008 it announced the launch of its digital service, Tiempo de Multivisión, in La Paz, with Santa Cruz and Cochabamba receiving the service within months. Its relay station in Tomatitas, Tarija, had its infrastructure damaged on April 12, 2009, the signal was restored precariously that evening. It was believed that the damaged equipment was vandalized. By July 2009, a year after its launch, the number of digital subscribers had increased by 40%, especially in Santa Cruz. A package for low-income subscribers was introduced in 2011. In 2011, for the company's 20th anniversary, it started broadcasting the Bolivian soccer league to its subscribers in the four departments simultaneously. It also announced an increase in channels and a digital video recorder. In October 2011, it planned the conversion of its Cochabamba head-end to digital, while in La Paz 70% of its subscribers had done so.

The arrival of bootleg satellite television systems in 2007 caused cable companies to lose profits. Multivisión lost US$500,000 in revenues from 2007 to 2012. Facing this issue, its website was hacked for a few hours on October 24, 2012 by the Bolivian division of the Anonymous group, shortly after hacking the website of regulatory body ATT. Their message was to improve the quality of cable television signals for people who weren't interested in a satellite TV subscription. On November 21, 2012, the day of the Bolivian census, it offered its premium movie channels for free to its subscribers for one day only. In January 2013, it extended its agreement to carry the DMX audio channels. On September 19, 2013, it started carrying the newly-launched TV Culturas in a four-hour block from 7pm to 11pm on its analog and digital information channel.

ATT announced that it would auction off the 2.5 GHz spectrum for mobile telephony, in order to introduce LTE services to Bolivia. In November 2013, it was announced that Tigo acquired Multivisión for a sum of US$20 million. Finally on April 30, 2014, the Tigo Star brand was presented, giving an end to the Multivisión brand. After its divestment from the main asset in Bolivia, the parent company was restructured in 2016 and now specializes in travel services and was relocated to Reno.
