= Multivision (Sri Lanka) =

Ruhuna 2001 Multivision, doing business as Comet Cable, was a pay TV service started in 1997 in Colombo Sri Lanka. The service was provided using Analog MMDS Technology. It was mainly available within the Colombo City Limits and had around 20 channels. The service was closed down when the company went bankrupt in 2008.

== History ==
Multivision launched its service, Comet Cable, in December 1998. The company was primarily owned by Vancouver-based Rystar Communications (90%) with a 10% minority stake held by the Sri Lankan Government. The government stake enabled Comet to operate nationwide.

After its bankruptcy, the parent company was taken over by Sky Media Network, who owned an unsuccessful digital terrestrial platform in 2010.

== Services ==
The service had about 20 channels during its period of operation. The service could be received with a monthly subscription using a MMDS Antenna and Decoder Unit.

Comet Cable in its existence was also known for its frequent technical issues. Frequent causes of complain were the lack of certain cricket tournaments broadcast on sports channels and lack of censorship on BBC World, prompting one subscriber to disconnect.

== Channel lineup ==
- HBO
- CNN International
- BBC World News
- ESPN
- STAR Sports
- TEN Sports
- AXN
- STAR World
- Hallmark Channel
- TNT
- MTV
- VH1
- National Geographical Channel
- Discovery Channel
- Animal Planet
- Cartoon Network
- Nickelodeon
- NHK World Premium
- Kermit Channel
- STAR Plus
