= Multivision (television technology) =

Early implementation of picture-in-picture television

MultiVision was one of the earliest implementations of PIP (picture-in-picture) television available for purchase by users, pioneered by engineer George Schnurle III and sold by the San Jose, California-based company Multivision Products Inc.

The original MultiVision model was a box that measured 17 inches (43 cm) by 10.5 inches (27 cm) and was 3 inches (7.6 cm) high. It required a VCR to operate and used its own tuner and the VCR to display two television channels. The television antenna was plugged into the MultiVision unit, which was then plugged into the television receiver's antenna input. The program selected on the MultiVision tuner was displayed in a small window inserted into the main TV picture at a position selected by the user. It also functioned as a switching device to connect additional peripherals (such as a laserdisc player) and offered audio outputs to connect external speakers and provide stereo sound. For monaural broadcasts and VHS tapes, the device could provide synthesized stereo audio.

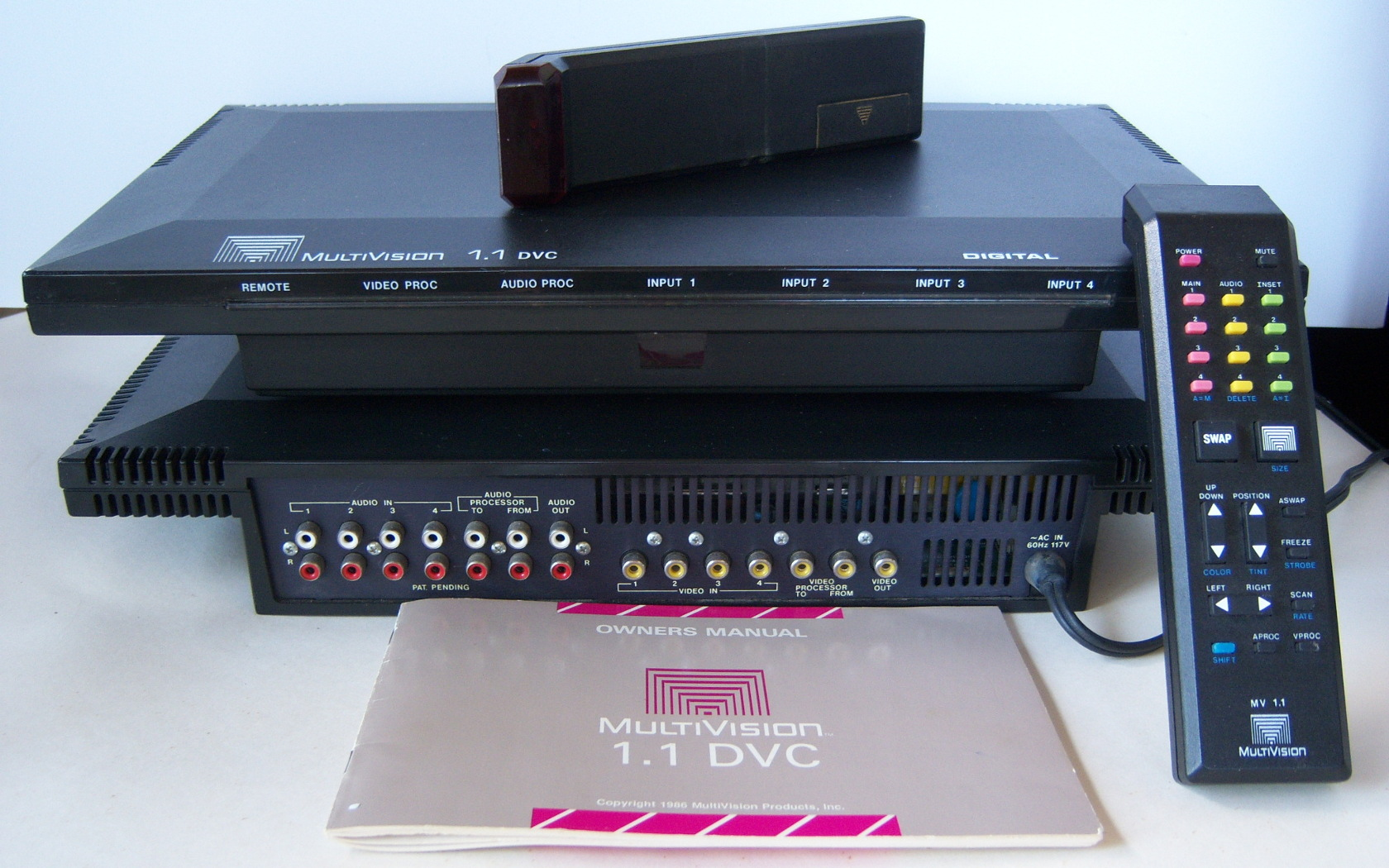
MultiVision 1.1 DVC "Digital" A/V controller front and rear views, with remote and manual

The MultiVision 3.1 model was an unusually shaped device, similar in size to the original, that lacked any form of controls on the device itself. It used its own two tuners and/or a VCR and/or other devices to display two video sources at once. The tunerless MultiVision 1.1 model looked virtually identical to the 3.1 except in rear view, and featured 4 composite, plus left and right audio input sets, plus switchable external audio and video processor loops. Both provided composite and left and right audio outputs for TV input.

On the 1.1 and 3.1 models, the audio could be set in sync to either the main source or the PIP or selected independently. The 1.1 model's remote had 12 color-coded buttons, 4 each for the main picture, PIP picture, and audio, and like the 3.1's remote included other buttons for swapping main and inset picture, PIP on/off, PIP size, PIP position, audio sync on or off, mute, and more. Their remotes featured angled output ends, which facilitated accurate button selection whilst reclined.
