= Picture-in-picture =

Display of a video window within another window

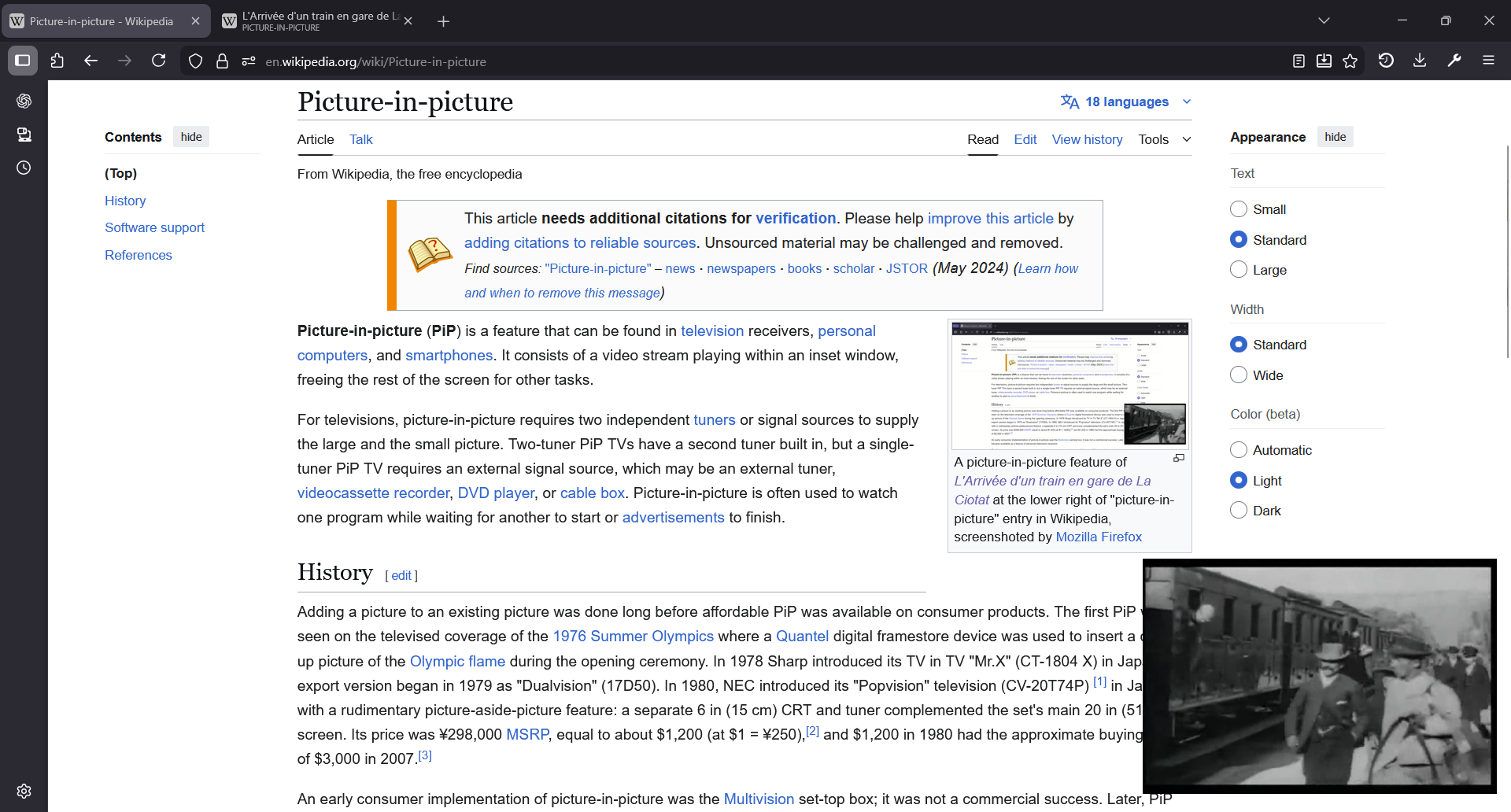
A picture-in-picture feature of L'Arrivée d'un train en gare de La Ciotat at the lower right of the "picture-in-picture" entry on Wikipedia, screenshotted on Mozilla Firefox

Picture-in-picture (PiP) is a feature that can be found in television receivers, personal computers, and smartphones. It consists of a video stream playing within an inset window, freeing the rest of the screen for other tasks.

For televisions, picture-in-picture requires two independent tuners or signal sources to supply the large and the small picture. Two-tuner PiP TVs have a second tuner built in, but a single-tuner PiP TV requires an external signal source, which may be an external tuner, videocassette recorder, DVD player, or cable box. Picture-in-picture is often used to watch one program while waiting for another to start or advertisements to finish.

== History ==
Adding a picture to an existing picture was done long before affordable PiP was available on consumer products. The first PiP was seen on the televised coverage of the 1976 Summer Olympics where a Quantel digital framestore device was used to insert a close-up picture of the Olympic flame during the opening ceremony. In 1978 Sharp introduced its TV in TV "Mr.X" (CT-1804 X) in Japan; the export version began in 1979 as "Dualvision" (17D50). In 1980, NEC introduced its "Popvision" television (CV-20T74P) in Japan with a rudimentary picture-aside-picture feature: a separate 6 in (15 cm) CRT and tuner complemented the set's main 20 in (51 cm) screen. Its price was ¥298,000 MSRP, equal to about $1,200 (at $1 = ¥250), and $1,200 in 1980 had the approximate buying power of $3,000 in 2007.

An early consumer implementation of picture-in-picture was the Multivision set-top box; it was not a commercial success. Later, PiP became available as a feature of advanced television receivers.

The first widespread consumer implementation of picture-in-picture was produced by Philips in 1983 in their high-end television sets. A separate video or RF input was available on the back of the set and displayed in black and white on one of the four corners of the screen. Televisions at the time were still in analog format, and earlier versions of the PiP implemented in analog were too costly. New digital technology allowed the second video signal to be digitized and saved in a digital memory chip, then replayed in a mini version. While the new technology was not good enough for color or full-screen viewing, it did provide a low-cost PiP feature.

The Blu-ray Disc and HD DVD specifications included picture-in-picture, allowing viewers to see content such as the director's commentary on a film they are watching. All the Blu-ray Disc titles in 2006 and 2007 that had a PiP track used two separate HD encodings, with one of the HD encodings including a hard-coded PiP track. Starting in 2008 Blu-ray Disc titles started being released that use one HD and one SD video track which can be combined with a Bonus View or BD-Live player. This method uses less disc space, allowing for PiP to be more easily added to a title. Several studios released Bonus View PiP Blu-ray Disc titles in 2008 such as Aliens vs. Predator: Requiem, Resident Evil: Extinction, V for Vendetta, and War.

In 2011, after DirecTV released the HR34 Home Media Center HD DVR, picture-in-picture was introduced to all HD DVR models onwards; The feature has five options: Upper Left, Upper Right, Lower Right, Lower Left, and Side-by-Side.

== Software support ==
Some streaming video websites may minimize a video stream similarly when browsing outside the playback page. Some web browsers (including Google Chrome, Firefox, and Safari) provide APIs or similar functions that allow a playing video to be opened in a pop-up overlay atop other applications.

The mobile operating systems Android (starting with Android 7.0 for Android TV devices and Android 8.0 for other devices) and iOS (starting with iOS 14) similarly provide native APIs for picture-in-picture overlays.
