= Salar Kamangar =

Iranian-American businessman, former CEO of YouTube

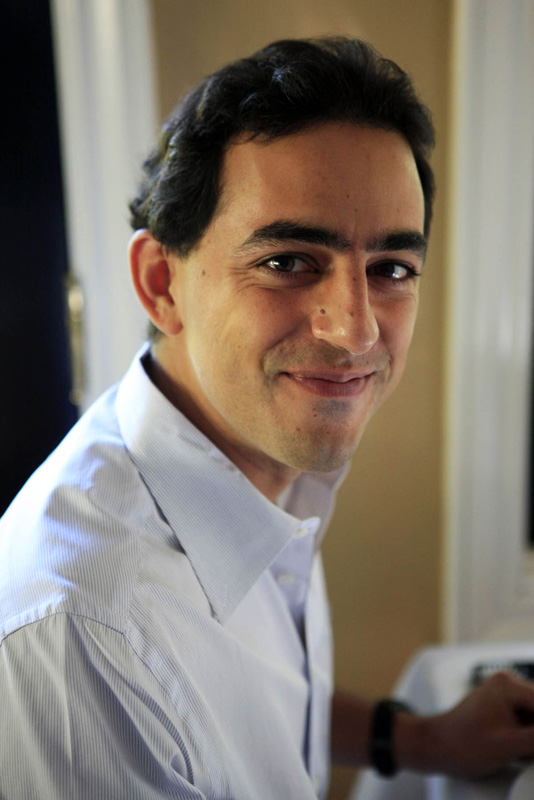
- Kamangar in 2008
- Born: 1976 (age 49–50); Tehran, Imperial State of Iran
- Education: Stanford University (BS)
- Occupation: Business executive
- Known for: Former CEO of YouTube
- Predecessor: Chad Hurley
- Successor: Susan Wojcicki

Salar Kamangar (Persian: سالار کمانگر; born 1976) is an Iranian-born American senior executive at Google and former CEO of Google's YouTube brand.

== Early childhood and education ==
Salar Kamangar, born in Tehran, holds a bachelor's degree in Biological Sciences with honors from Stanford University and was the 9th employee to join Google. He joined after graduating from Stanford in 1998. Kamangar attended Merced High School in Merced, California and graduated in 1994. He was voted "Most Likely to Succeed" by his graduating class.

== Google ==
On October 29, 2010, it was announced that Salar "SK" Kamangar, who was in charge of day-to-day activities, would replace Chad Hurley as CEO of YouTube. He was replaced as CEO of YouTube on February 5, 2014. His successor at YouTube was Susan Wojcicki.

Before that, Kamangar created the company's first business plan and was responsible for its legal and finance functions. From there, he became a founding member of Google's product team, where he worked on consumer projects including the acquisition of DejaNews and the subsequent launch of Google Groups.
