= Me at the zoo =

First video uploaded to YouTube

- The full YouTube video "Me at the zoo"
- Produced by: Jawed Karim
- Starring: Jawed Karim
- Cinematography: Yakov Lapitsky
- Release date: April 23, 2005; 8:31 p.m. PDT
- Running time: 19 seconds
- Country: United States
- Language: English

"Me at the zoo" is a YouTube video uploaded on April 23, 2005, recognized as the first video uploaded to the platform. The 19-second video features Jawed Karim, one of the co-founders of YouTube, being recorded by his high school friend, Yakov Lapitsky. In the video, Karim is seen standing in front of two elephants at the San Diego Zoo in California, where he briefly comments on the length of their trunks.

Multiple journalists have opined that the video represented YouTube as a whole and stated it was a milestone of the platform's history. Karim has later updated the video's description several times. As of November 2026, the video has received more than 448 million views.

== Background ==
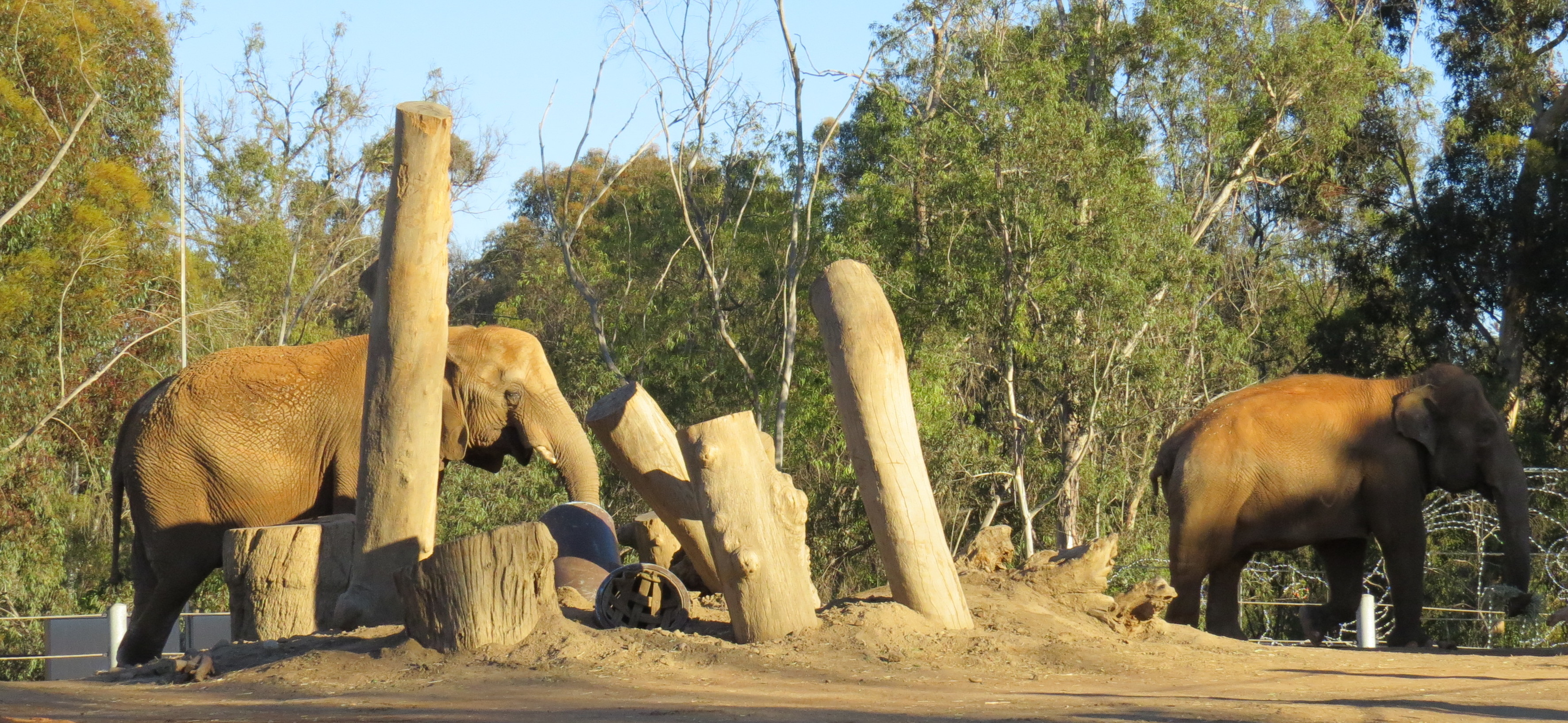
Elephants at the San Diego Zoo in 2013, where "Me at the zoo" was filmed

YouTube was founded in 2005 by three former PayPal employees – Chad Hurley, Steve Chen, and Jawed Karim. Hurley studied design at the Indiana University of Pennsylvania, while Chen studied computer science at the University of Illinois Urbana-Champaign. Karim stated that inspiration for the platform came from the Super Bowl XXXVIII halftime show controversy and the 2004 Indian Ocean earthquake and tsunami. He was unable to find video clips of these events online, which gave him the idea to start a video-sharing website.

== Release ==
"Me at the zoo" was uploaded on April 23, 2005, at 8:31:52 p.m. PDT. It shows Karim at the San Diego Zoo in California, in front of two elephants. In the 19-second video, he notes the length of their trunks. His high school friend Yakov Lapitsky recorded the video. In it, Karim states:

Alright, so here we are in front of the, uh, elephants, and the cool thing about these guys is that, is that they have really, really, really long, um, trunks, and that's – that's cool. And that's pretty much all there is to say.

== Retrospective reception ==
Multiple publications agreed that the video embodies YouTube as a whole. Business Insider ranked it the most important YouTube video of all time, stating that it is emblematic of YouTube's user-generated nature. The New York Observer also ranked it as the most important video in YouTube history, noting its historical significance. BuzzFeed News listed it among the 20 most important online videos of all time. As the first video on YouTube, it has also been described as the first YouTube vlog.

Reviewers thought that "Me at the zoo" was a monumental part of YouTube's history. Aaron Duplantier, in his book Authenticity and How We Fake It: Belief and Subjectivity in Reality TV, Facebook and YouTube, stated that the ordinary nature of "Me at the zoo" set the tone for the type of original, amateur content that would become typical of YouTube, especially among YouTubers and vloggers. The Los Angeles Times explained in 2009 that "Me at the zoo" made a significant change in how media was consumed, establishing an era of short videos. Digital Trends deemed it set a standard for future videos on YouTube. Film critic Peter Bradshaw listed the video as one of the key releases of the 2000s.

The official San Diego Zoo YouTube account left a now-pinned comment on the video in 2020, stating "We're so honored that the first ever YouTube video was filmed here!" As of November 1, 2026, it is the most-liked comment on the platform, with 4.8 million likes. In February 2026, the Victoria and Albert Museum in London acquired a reconstructed early webpage and the "Me at the zoo" video, built by the museum's digital conservation team over 18 months.

== Changes to original video ==
Karim has repeatedly used the video's description to criticize YouTube's business actions. In response to Google requiring YouTube users to use Google+ accounts to comment on videos, he updated the description in November 2013 to say, "why the fuck do i need a google+ account to comment on a video?" He changed the video's description again in November 2021 in response to YouTube's decision to remove video dislikes from public view, stating, "When every YouTuber agrees that removing dislikes is a stupid idea, it probably is. Try again, YouTube." A few days later, he again updated the description to include a longer condemnation of YouTube's decision. On December 16, 2023, the video thumbnail was changed to a MrBeast-style image of Karim with fiery eyes and pointing at a background image of stampeding elephants. It was reverted to the original thumbnail two weeks later. In February 2025, Karim updated the description to refer to the danger of microplastics to the brain. The description also contains timestamps for chapters: "Intro", "The cool thing", and "End".
