= Jawed Karim =

American entrepreneur and software engineer (born 1979)

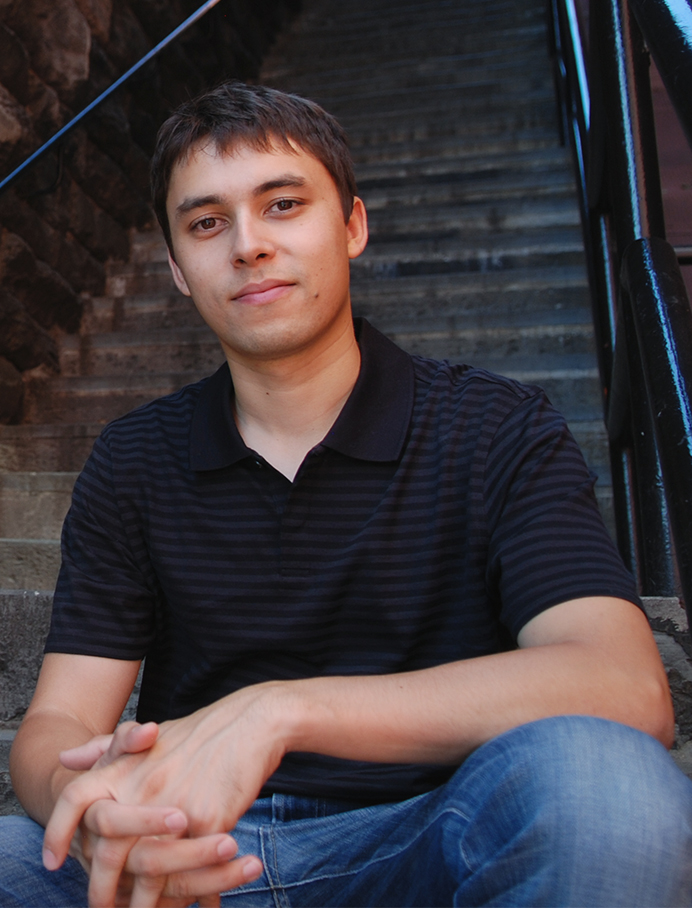
- Karim in 2008
- Born: October 28, 1979 (age 47); Merseburg, Bezirk Halle, East Germany (now Merseburg, Saxony-Anhalt, Germany)
- Education: University of Illinois Urbana–Champaign (BS); Stanford University (MS)
- Occupation: Software engineer
- Known for: Co-founding YouTube; uploading the first video on YouTube ("Me at the zoo")

YouTube information
- Channels: jawed; jawedNOW
- Years active: 2005–2007; 2010 (videos); 2018–2019 (Jungle soundscape and Jawed's live stream)
- Genre: Educational
- Subscribers: 6.72 million; 124 thousand (jawedNOW)
- Views: 447 million; None (jawedNOW)
- Last updated: October 29, 2026
- Website: jawed.com

Jawed Karim (born October 28, 1979) is a German and American software engineer and internet entrepreneur of Bangladeshi-German descent. He is one of the co-founders of YouTube and the first person to upload a video to the site. The site's inaugural video, "Me at the zoo", uploaded on April 23, 2005, has been viewed over 447 million times as of October 2026. During Karim's time working at PayPal, where he met fellow YouTube co-founders Steve Chen and Chad Hurley, he designed many of its core components, including its real-time anti-fraud system.

== Early life and education ==
Jawed Karim was born on October 28, 1979, in Merseburg, East Germany, to a Bangladeshi father and a German mother. His father Naimul Karim (Bengali: নাইমুল করিম) is a Bangladeshi who is a researcher at 3M, and his mother, Christine, is a German biochemistry scientist at the University of Minnesota. He was the elder of two boys. He crossed the inner German border with his family in the early 1980s due to experiencing racism, growing up in Neuss, West Germany. (Note: Sources vary regarding the year that the family moved from East Germany to West Germany. The New York Times says 1980. Star Weekend Magazine says at the end of summer 1981. Die Welt says 1982.) Facing racism there as well, Karim moved with his family to Saint Paul, Minnesota, United States, in 1992.

He graduated from Saint Paul Central High School in 1997, and attended the University of Illinois at Urbana-Champaign. He left campus prior to graduating to become an early employee at PayPal. He continued his coursework, earning his bachelor's degree in computer science. He subsequently earned a master's degree in computer science from Stanford University. In addition to his native language German, he speaks English and Bengali.

== Career ==
"Me at the zoo", the first video on YouTube, was uploaded by Karim on April 23, 2005.

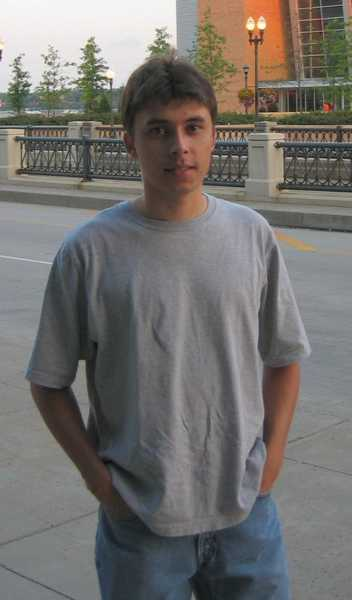
Karim in September 2004

In university, Karim served an Internship at Silicon Graphics, Inc., where he worked on 3D voxel data management for very large data sets for volume rendering, including the data for the Visible Human Project. While working at PayPal in 2002, he met Chad Hurley and Steve Chen. Three years later, in 2005, they founded the video-sharing website YouTube. Karim created the first account on YouTube, "jawed", on April 23, 2005 PDT (April 24, 2005 UTC), and uploaded the website's first video, "Me at the zoo", the same day.

After co-founding the company and developing the YouTube concept and website with Chad Hurley and Steve Chen, Karim enrolled as a graduate student in computer science at Stanford University while acting as an adviser to YouTube. When the site was founded in February 2005, Karim agreed not to be an employee and simply be an informal adviser, and that he was focusing on his studies. As a result, he took a much lower share in the company compared to Hurley and Chen.

Because of his smaller role in the company, Karim was mostly unknown to the public as the third founder until YouTube was acquired by Google in 2006. Despite his lower share in the company, the purchase was still large enough that he received 137,443 shares of stock, worth about $64 million based on Google's closing stock price at the time.

In October 2006, Karim gave a lecture about the history of YouTube at the University of Illinois annual ACM Conference entitled YouTube From Concept to Hyper growth. Karim returned again to the University of Illinois in May 2008 as the 136th and youngest commencement speaker in the school's history.

== Investments ==
In March 2008, Karim launched a venture fund called Youniversity Ventures (now known as YVentures) with partners Keith Rabois and Kevin Hartz. Karim is one of Airbnb's first investors, investing in the company's initial seed round in April 2009. YVentures has also invested in Palantir, Reddit and Eventbrite.

== Responses to YouTube ==
Occasionally, Karim has updated the video description of "Me at the zoo" to criticize decisions made by YouTube.

On November 6, 2013, YouTube began requiring that commenting on its videos be done via a Google+ account, a move that was widely opposed by the YouTube community. An online petition to revert the change garnered over 240,000 signatures.

In response to Google requiring YouTube members to use Google+ for its comment system, Karim wrote on his YouTube account, "why the fuck do i need a Google+ account to comment on a video?", and updated the video description on his first video titled "Me at the zoo" to "I can't comment here anymore, since i don't want a Google+ account".

In response to pressure from the YouTube community, Google publicly apologized for forcing Google+ users to use their real names, which was one of the reasons the Google+ integration was unpopular with YouTube users. Google subsequently dropped its Google+ requirement across all products, beginning with YouTube. Google announced in October 2018 its intention to permanently shut down Google+, as it had failed to achieve broad consumer or developer adoption, and because of a vulnerability that exposed 500,000 users' data. Google+ was closed for personal accounts on April 2, 2019.

In November 2021, Jawed updated the "Me at the zoo" video description to include "When every YouTuber agrees that removing dislikes is a stupid idea, it probably is. Try again, YouTube🤦‍♂️." A few days later, Karim updated the description again to a more detailed condemnation of YouTube's decision. In February 2025, Jawed updated the "Me at the zoo" video's description to refer to the danger of microplastics to the brain.

== See also ==
- PayPal Mafia
- History of YouTube
