= Chad Hurley =

American businessman (born 1977)

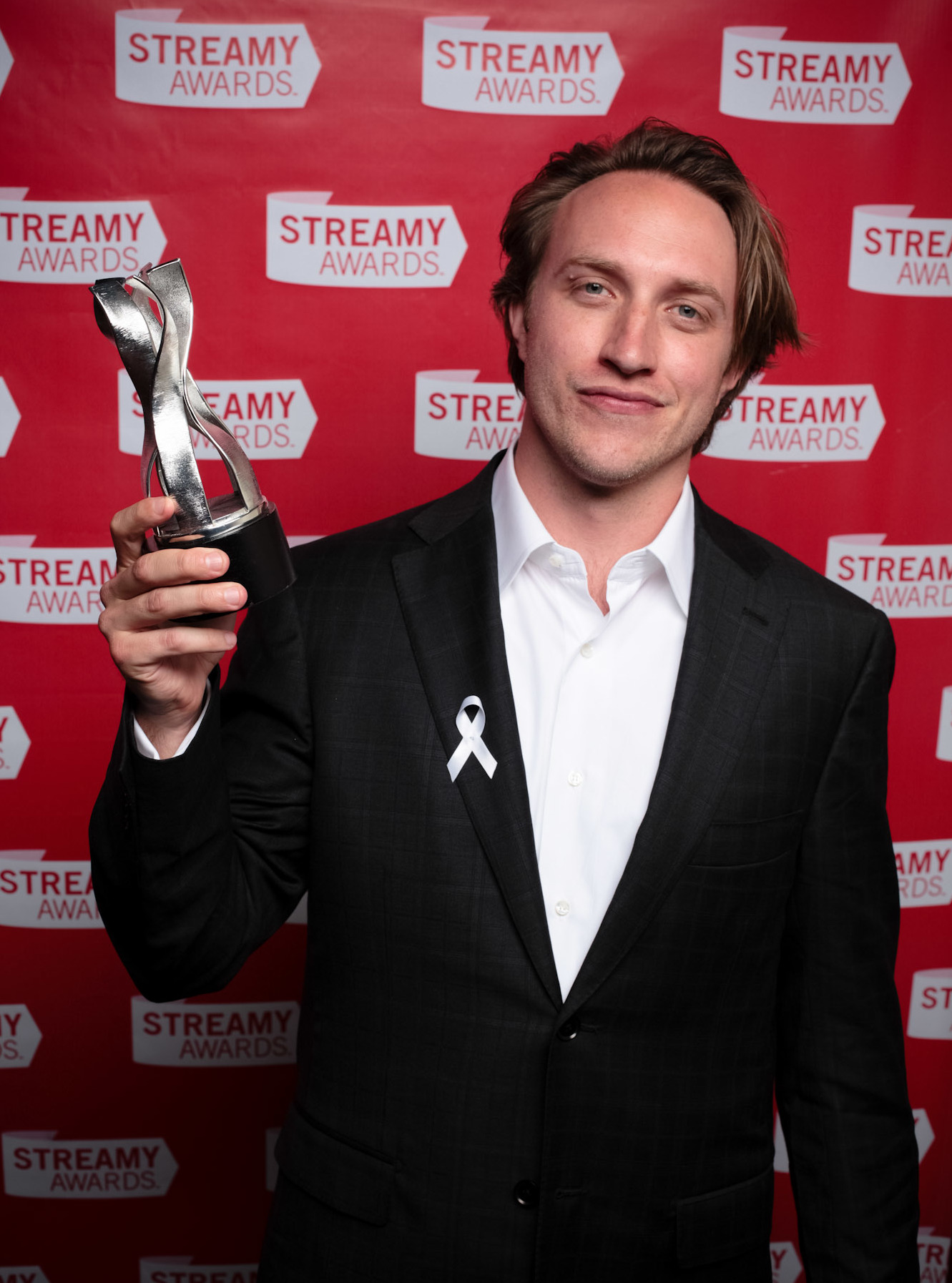
- Hurley in 2010
- Born: Chad Meredith Hurley; January 24, 1977 (age 49); Reading, Pennsylvania, U.S.
- Education: Indiana University of Pennsylvania (BA)
- Occupations: Webmaster; Businessman
- Known for: Co-founder of YouTube and AVOS
- Successor: Salar Kamangar (as CEO of YouTube)
- Spouse(s): Kathy Clark (div. 2012) Elise Walden (m. 2020)

Chad Meredith Hurley (born January 24, 1977) is an American webmaster and businessman who served as the chief executive officer (CEO) of YouTube from its founding until 2010, when he became an advisor to the company. He also co-founded MixBit, a since closed video sharing service. In October 2006, he and Steve Chen sold YouTube for $1.65 billion to Google. Hurley worked in eBay's PayPal division, where one of his tasks involved designing the original PayPal logo, before co-founding YouTube with fellow PayPal employees Steve Chen and Jawed Karim. Hurley was primarily responsible for the tagging and video-sharing aspects of YouTube.

== Early life and education ==
Chad Meredith Hurley was born on January 24, 1977, in Reading, Pennsylvania. He is the second child of Don and Joann Hurley, and he grew up near Birdsboro, Pennsylvania. He has an older sister, Heather, and a younger brother, Brent.

Since childhood, Hurley showed interest in the arts, and became interested in computers and electronic media during high school. He was a standout runner for Twin Valley High School's cross-country program, which won two of its PIAA State titles with him as a member in 1992 and 1994. He was also a member of the Technology Student Association during high school. He graduated from Twin Valley High School in 1995 and earned a BA in Fine Art from Indiana University of Pennsylvania in 1999.

== Career ==
=== YouTube ===
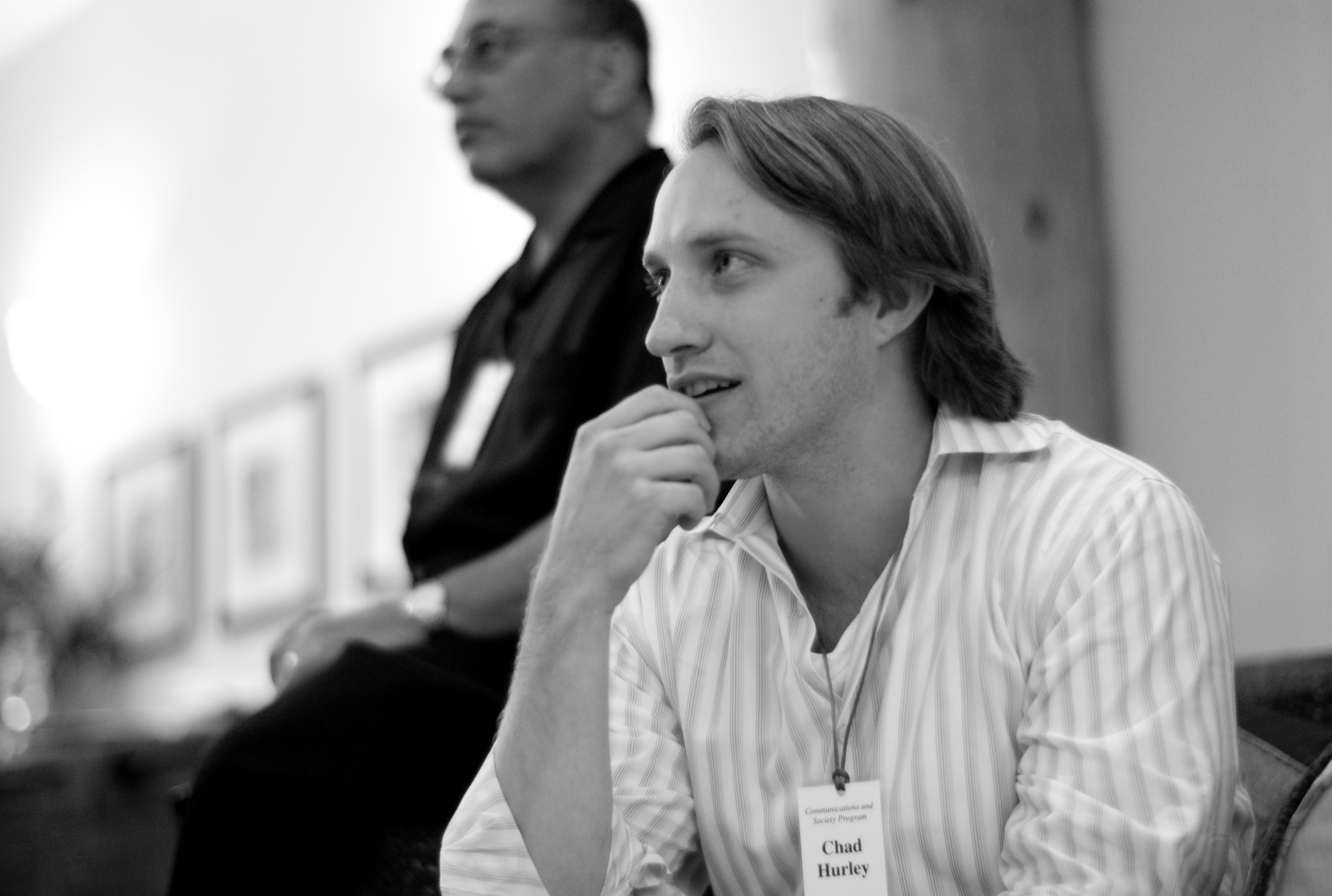
Hurley in 2007

Hurley founded YouTube in 2005 with Steve Chen and Jawed Karim. On October 9, 2006, Chen and Hurley sold YouTube to Google Inc. (now Alphabet) for $1.65 billion. It was reported in The Wall Street Journal that Hurley's share was $345.6M at Google's February 7, 2007, closing stock price of $470.01. He received 694,087 Google shares directly and another 41,232 shares in a trust.

YouTube's other two co-founders, Steve Chen and Jawed Karim, received 625,366 shares and 137,443 shares, respectively valued at $326.2M and $64.6M. The Journal's report was based on Google's registration statement with SEC filed on February 7, 2007.

Hurley resigned as CEO of YouTube in October 2010 but stated he would remain as an advisor of YouTube. Salar Kamangar was appointed to the CEO position following Hurley's resignation.

=== MixBit ===
In August 2013, Hurley launched another company called MixBit, which provided video editing while using smartphones. According to Steve Chen, it was Hurley's idea to turn Avos into MixBit even before the inception of YouTube.

The app resembles other short-video recording smartphone apps such as Vine, Instagram and Vyclone. Its limit of recording stretches up to 256 clips, and each clip can be maximum 16 seconds long. It also features the editing tools similar to its other competitor apps.

=== Formula One ===
Hurley was involved as a major investor with US F1 Team, one of the new entrants in Formula One automobile racing for the 2010 season. On March 2, 2010, the team's personnel were dismissed from their duties and the team was unofficially shut down. Neither Hurley, team principal Ken Anderson nor sporting director Peter Windsor would comment on the team's failure to make it to the grid.

=== Investments ===
Hurley has made several investments. He is a minority owner of the NBA's Golden State Warriors and the MLS' Los Angeles Football Club.

On January 25, 2021, Hurley announced on Twitter that he had become an investor at Leeds United, the English Premier League football club.

== Personal life ==
Hurley was formerly married to Kathy Clark, the daughter of Silicon Valley entrepreneur James H. Clark. They divorced in 2012. Hurley remarried in 2020 to Elise Walden.
