= Steve Chen =

Taiwanese-American Internet entrepreneur (born 1978)

- 陳士駿
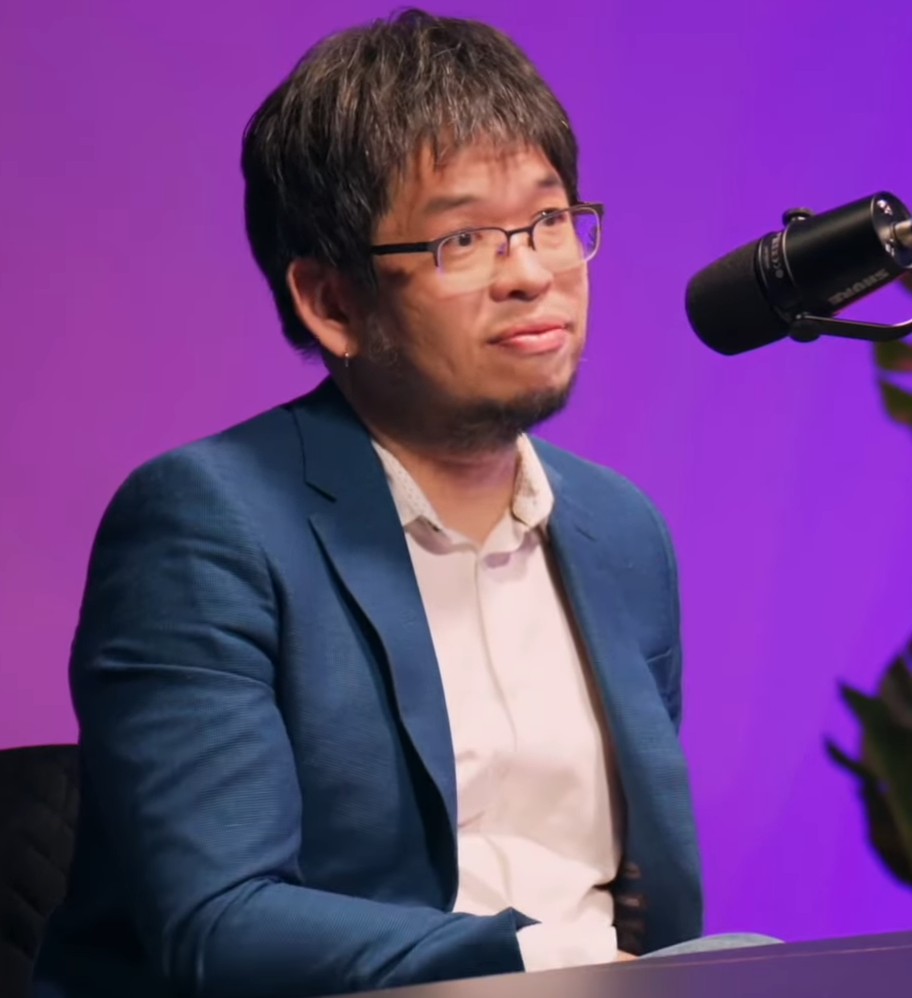
- Chen in May 2022
- Born: August 25, 1978 (age 48); Taipei, Taiwan
- Education: University of Illinois Urbana-Champaign
- Occupation: Software engineer
- Known for: Co-founder of YouTube & AVOS
- Spouse: Park Ji-hyun (Jamie Chen)
- Children: 2

Chinese name
- Traditional Chinese: 陳士駿
- Simplified Chinese: 陈士骏
Transcriptions
Standard Mandarin
- Hanyu Pinyin: Chén Shìjùn
- Gwoyeu Romatzyh: Chern Shyhjiunn
- Wade–Giles: Ch'en Shih-chün

Steve Chen (Chinese: 陳士駿; Wade–Giles: Chen Shih-chün; born August 25, 1978) is a Taiwanese-American software engineer and Internet entrepreneur who is a co-founder and ex-CTO of YouTube. After he co-founded AVOS Systems, Inc. and built MixBit, he joined Google Ventures in 2014.

== Early life and education ==
Chen was born in Taipei, Taiwan. When he was seven years old, he and his family immigrated to the United States in 1986 and settled in Arlington Heights, Illinois. He went to Thomas Middle School in Arlington Heights for his middle school education and John Hersey High School in Arlington Heights for his freshman year of high school. For his final three years of high school, he attended the Illinois Mathematics and Science Academy in Aurora, Illinois. After graduating from high school, Chen was educated at the University of Illinois at Urbana-Champaign, where he studied computer science, then decided to leave the university in 1999 in order to go to Silicon Valley.

== Business career ==
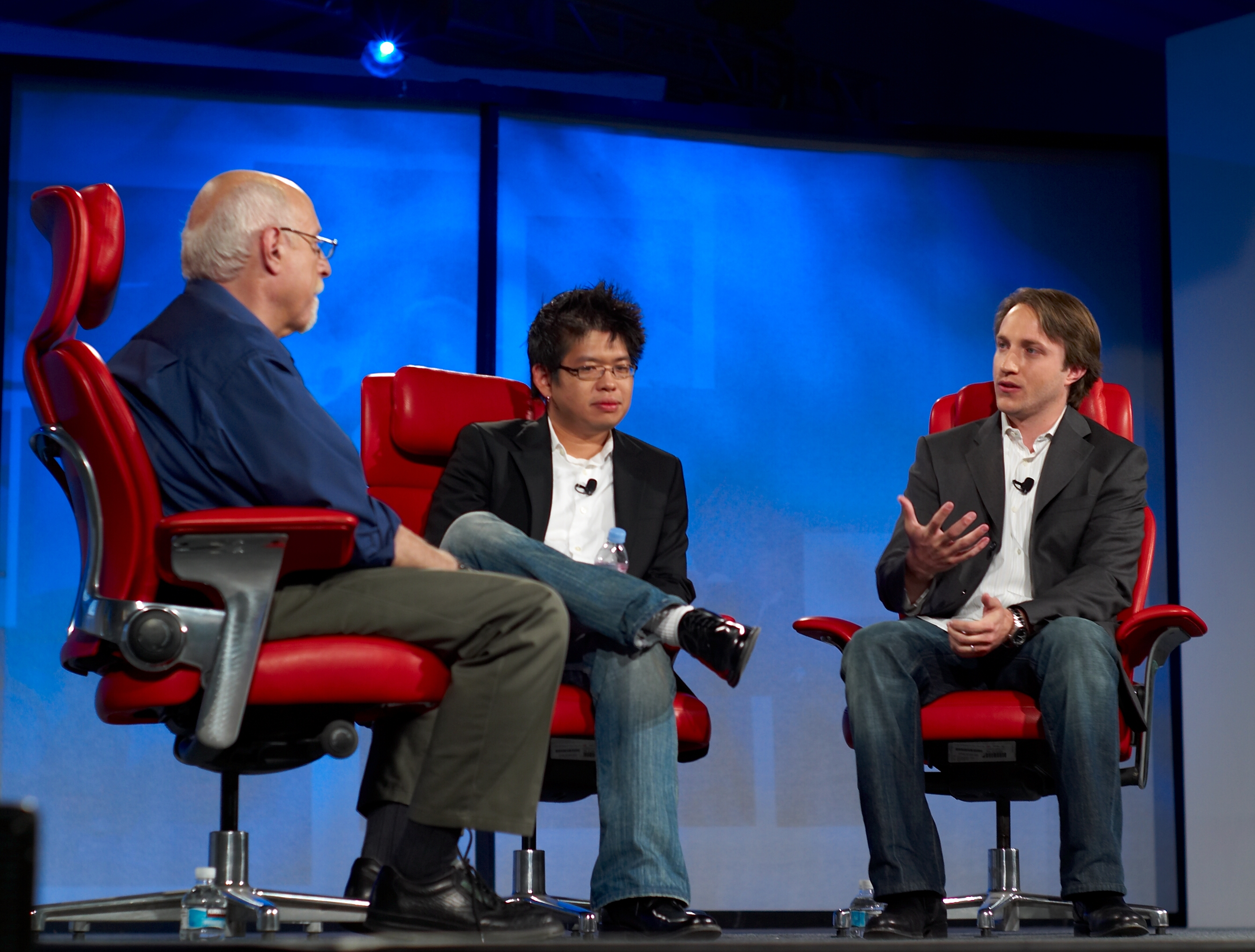
Chen (middle) with YouTube cofounder Chad Hurley at the 2007 All Things Digital conference

Chen was an employee at PayPal, where he first met Chad Hurley and Jawed Karim. Chen was also an early employee at Facebook, although he left after several months to start YouTube.

In 2005, Chad Hurley, Jawed Karim and Steve Chen founded YouTube, with Chen having the position of chief technology officer. In June 2006, Chen was named by Business 2.0 as one of "The 50 people who matter now" in business.

On October 9, 2006, Chen and Hurley sold YouTube to Google, Inc. for $1.65 billion. Chen received 625,366 shares of Google and an additional 68,721 in a trust as part of the sale. As of September 2021, the Google shares are valued at almost $1.77 billion.

He and Hurley started AVOS Systems, which acquired Delicious from Yahoo! Inc.

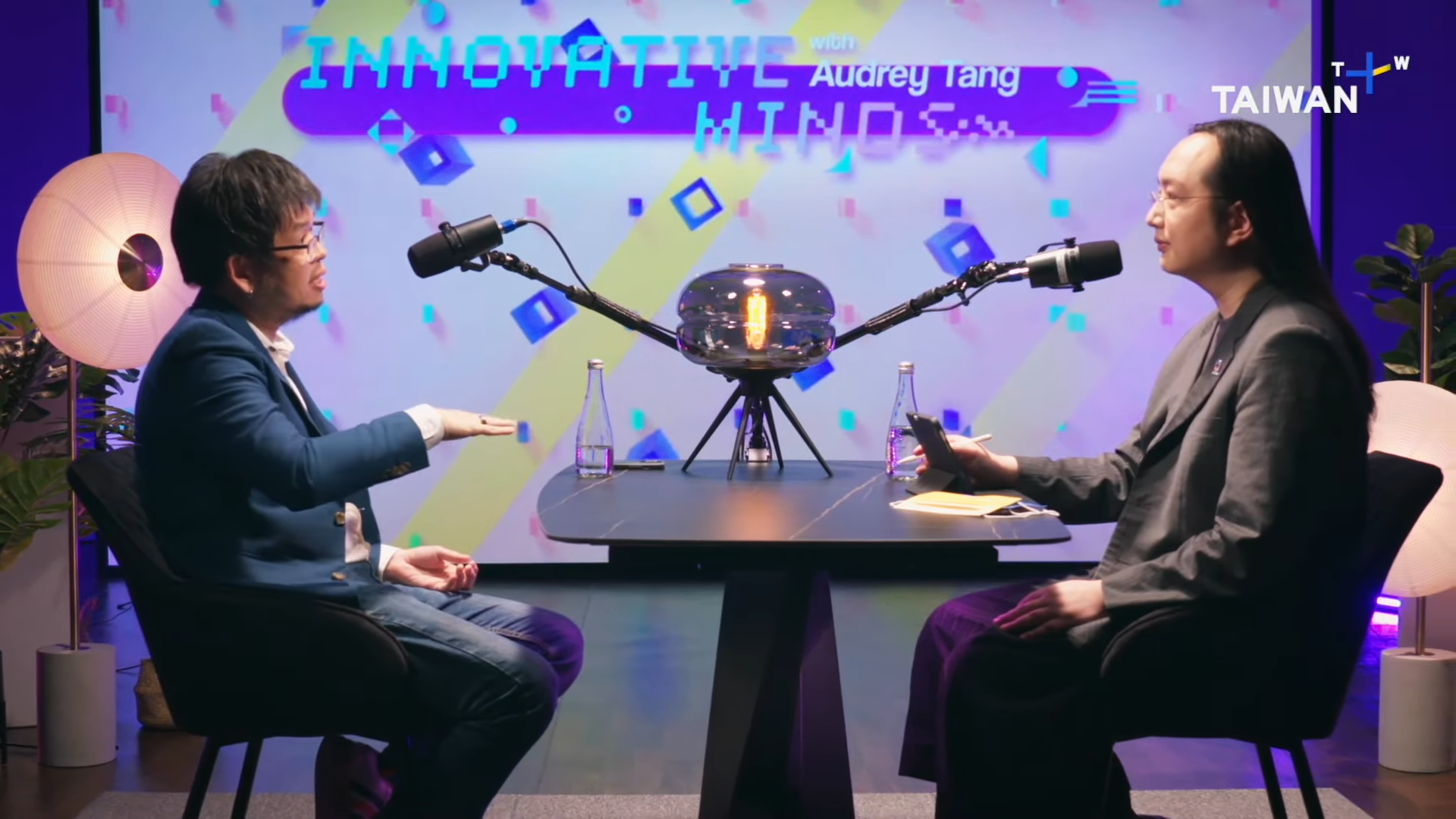
Chen (left) in an interview with Audrey Tang (2022)

Chen was listed as one of the 15 Asian Scientists To Watch by Asian Scientist on 15 May 2011.

Chen started the live-streaming food network Nom.com in 2016 along with Vijay Karunamurthy. In 2017, Nom.com was shut down, with its Twitter feed switched to private and its Facebook account left idle since March 2017.

== Awards ==
Chen was inducted as a Laureate of The Lincoln Academy of Illinois and awarded the Order of Lincoln (the State's highest honor) by the Governor of Illinois in 2018.

== Personal life ==
In 2009, Chen married Park Ji-hyun, a Google Korea product marketing manager, who changed her name to Jamie Chen. They have two children, including a son who was born in July 2010. The Chens are major supporters of the Asian Art Museum of San Francisco, where Jamie was appointed a trustee in July 2012. In August 2019, the Chens moved to Taipei, Taiwan.

== See also ==
- Jawed Karim
- Chad Hurley
- List of Taiwanese Americans
- Taiwanese Americans
