= List of notable YouTube videos of the 2010s =

YouTube logo from 2013-2015

This is a list of YouTube videos from the 2010s that journalists, online newspaper, or magazines have written about. To be considered for this list: the videos must be included on many separate articles from different publications (inclusive of all time periods), as chosen by their editorial staff. Each video must be recognised mainly for its corresponding YouTube upload, and already has an article on Wikipedia.

== 2010 ==
=== AC Transit bus fight ===
AC Transit Bus fight is an American viral video depicting a physical altercation between two men aboard an AC Transit bus in Oakland, California, on February 15, 2010. The altercation was recorded by a nearby passenger, who uploaded it to video hosting website YouTube. It ranked among the top five most viewed videos on YouTube in its first week, but was not included in the official list, and has received over six million views. (Note: AC Transit bus fight:)

=== "Agents of Secret Stuff" ===
Agents of Secret Stuff is a 2010 American action comedy short film created and co-directed by Wesley Chan, Ted Fu, and Philip Wang of Wong Fu Productions, and Ryan Higa. The film stars Ryan Higa, Arden Cho, and Dominic Sandoval, and also features cameos by several other YouTube users. The film had a theatrical debut in Los Angeles on November 23, 2010, and was released on YouTube on November 24. (Note: Agents of Secret Stuff:)

=== Justin Bieber - Baby ft. Ludacris ===
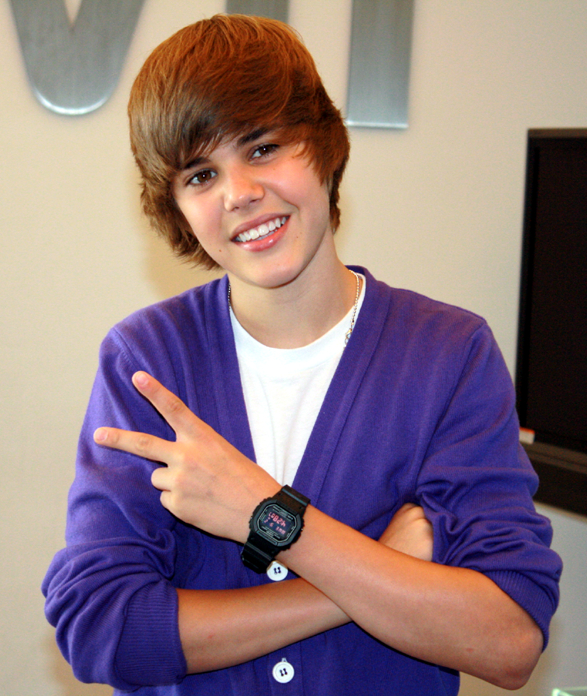
Justin Bieber from Baby

Baby is a song by Canadian singer Justin Bieber featuring American rapper Ludacris. It was released as the lead single on Bieber's debut studio album, My World 2.0. The track was written by the artists alongside Christina Milian and producers Tricky Stewart and The-Dream. The official music video is the 39th most-viewed video on YouTube. As of January 2025, it is also the fourth-most-disliked video and the most-disliked music video on the platform. (Note: Baby (Justin Bieber song):)

=== Bed Intruder Song ===
Bed Intruder Song is a song by the Gregory Brothers and Antoine Dodson, featuring Kelly Dodson. The song, created for Auto-Tune the News, features processed vocals of a WAFF-48 news interview with Antoine Dodson, who was talking to a reporter about a home invasion and attempted rape of his sister Kelly. The original music video for "Bed Intruder Song" went viral, becoming YouTube's most popular video of 2010. As of September 10, 2023, it has been viewed over 154 million views and has received 1.2 million likes since it was uploaded on July 30, 2010. (Note: Bed Intruder Song:)

=== Yosemitebear Mountain Double Rainbow 1-8-10 ===
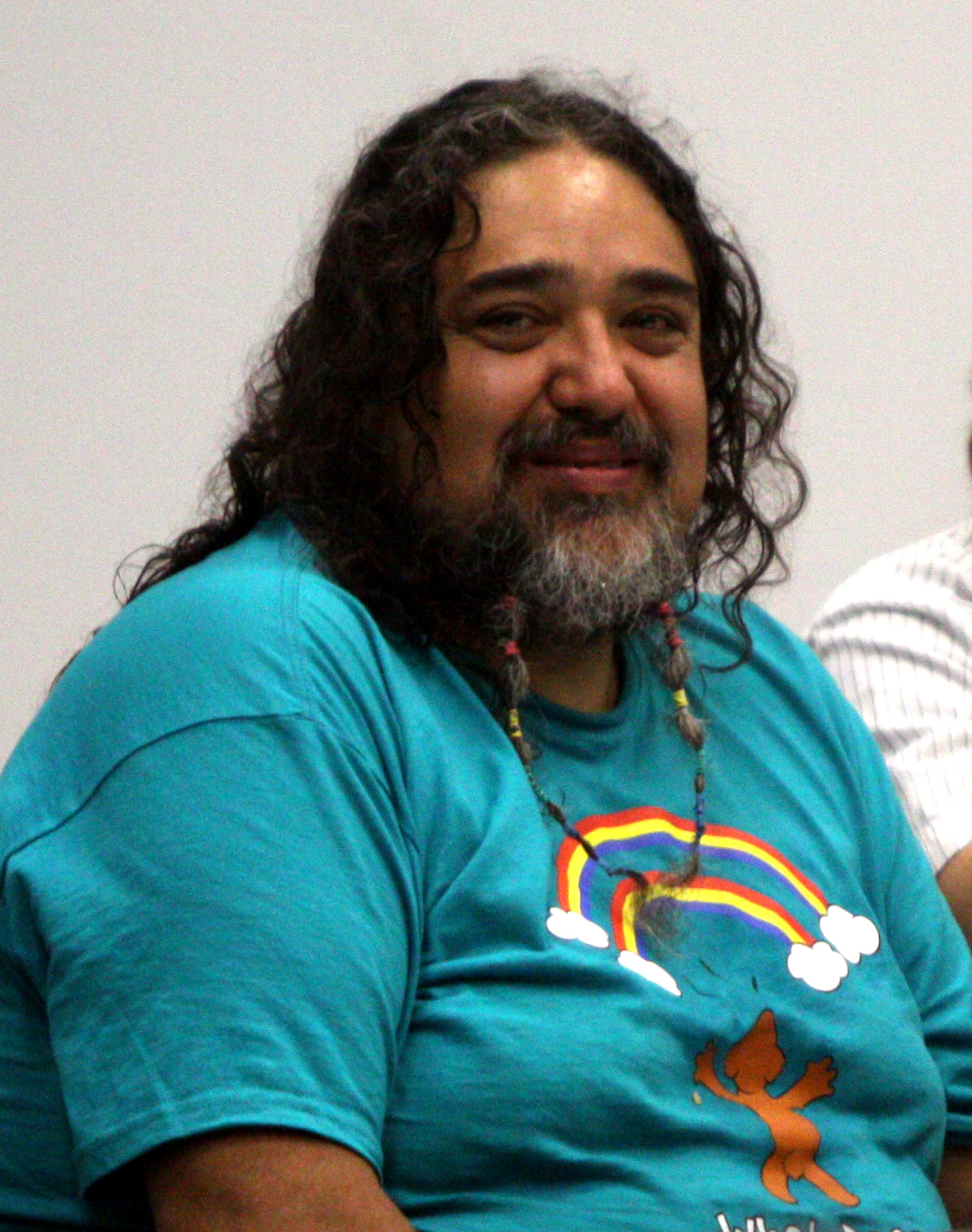
Paul Bear from Double Rainbow

Double Rainbow is a viral video filmed by Paul "Bear" Vasquez (September 5, 1962 – May 9, 2020). The clip, filmed in 2010 in his front yard just outside Yosemite National Park in California, shows his ecstatic reaction to a double rainbow. As of May 2025, Vasquez's video had accumulated more than 51 million views on YouTube. (Note: Double Rainbow (viral video):)

=== Gap Yah ===
Gap Yah is a comedy sketch that gained widespread popularity and press coverage, especially in the United Kingdom, after being published on the video-sharing site YouTube in February 2010. It was created and performed by the University of Oxford graduate Matt Lacey of sketch comedy theatre troupe The Unexpected Items. (Note: Gap Yah:)

=== Minecraft Multiplayer Fun ===
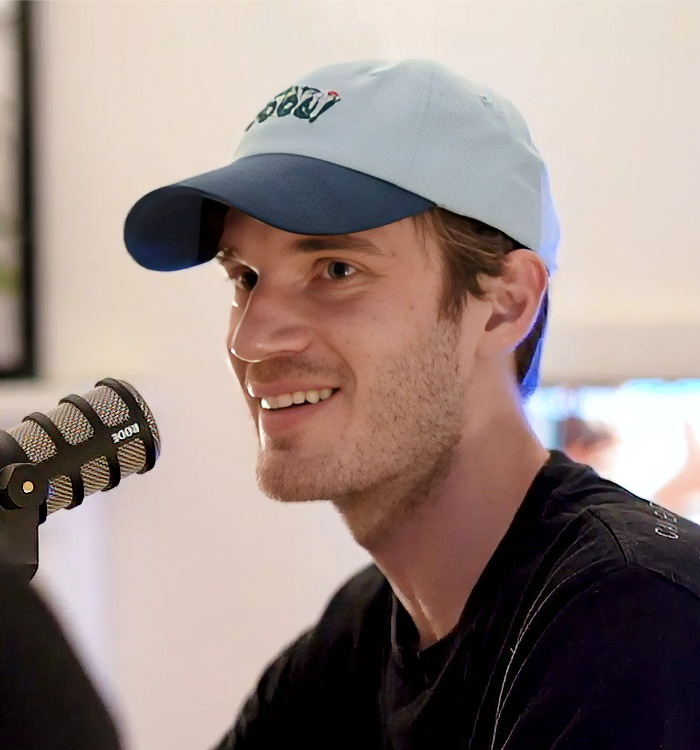
Pewdiepie from Minecraft Multiplayer Fun

Minecraft Multiplayer Fun is a 2010 YouTube video, noted for being the oldest video available for viewing on the PewDiePie channel. The video was uploaded by Felix Kjellberg, the owner of the channel, on 2 October 2010. Also featuring Xebaz, a friend of Kjellberg's, the video shows the two playing Minecraft, a sandbox video game. "Minecraft Multiplayer Fun" has been viewed more than 22 million times as of March 2024. (Note: Minecraft Multiplayer Fun:)

=== Gunman Kills Self After Opening Fire on Florida School Board ===
The Panama City shootings occurred on December 14, 2010, in Panama City, Florida. In the attack, a disgruntled individual, Clay Allen Duke, fired four or five shots at six Bay District School board members, but missed them all, including the superintendent. The video was subsequently uploaded to video sharing sites, including YouTube. (Note: Panama City school board shootings:)

=== We Are The World 25 For Haiti (YouTube Edition) ===
We Are the World 25 for Haiti (YouTube edition) is a collaborative charity song and music video produced by singer-songwriter Lisa Lavie and posted to the YouTube video sharing website to raise money for victims of the January 12, 2010 Haiti earthquake. Within days after it was posted the video became the subject of media attention. The video received its first half-million views on YouTube in two days, and more than 830,000 views in its first six days. (Note: We Are the World 25 for Haiti (YouTube edition):)

== 2011 ==
=== The Crazy Nastyass Honey Badger (original narration by Randall) ===
The Crazy Nastyass Honey Badger is a YouTube viral video and Internet meme that first appeared on the Internet in January 2011. The video features commentary by a narrator identified only as "Randall", dubbed over pre-existing National Geographic Wild footage of honey badgers. Accompanying the narration is the Prelude from J. S. Bach's Cello Suite No. 6 in D major, BWV 1012. Since its release, the video has gained more than 100 million views. (Note: The Crazy Nastyass Honey Badger:)

=== Don't Hug Me I'm Scared ===
Don't Hug Me I'm Scared (DHMIS) is a British surrealist adult puppet musical horror comedy web series created by Becky Sloan and Joe Pelling. The series is notable for its blending of surrealism and morbid humour with horror and musical elements. Its production is diverse, combining puppetry, live action, and styles of animation including stop motion, traditional animation, flash animation, clay animation, and computer animation. The original series consisted of 6 short episodes released from 29 July 2011 to 19 June 2016 on YouTube. (Note: Don't Hug Me I'm Scared:)

=== Rebecca Black - Friday ===
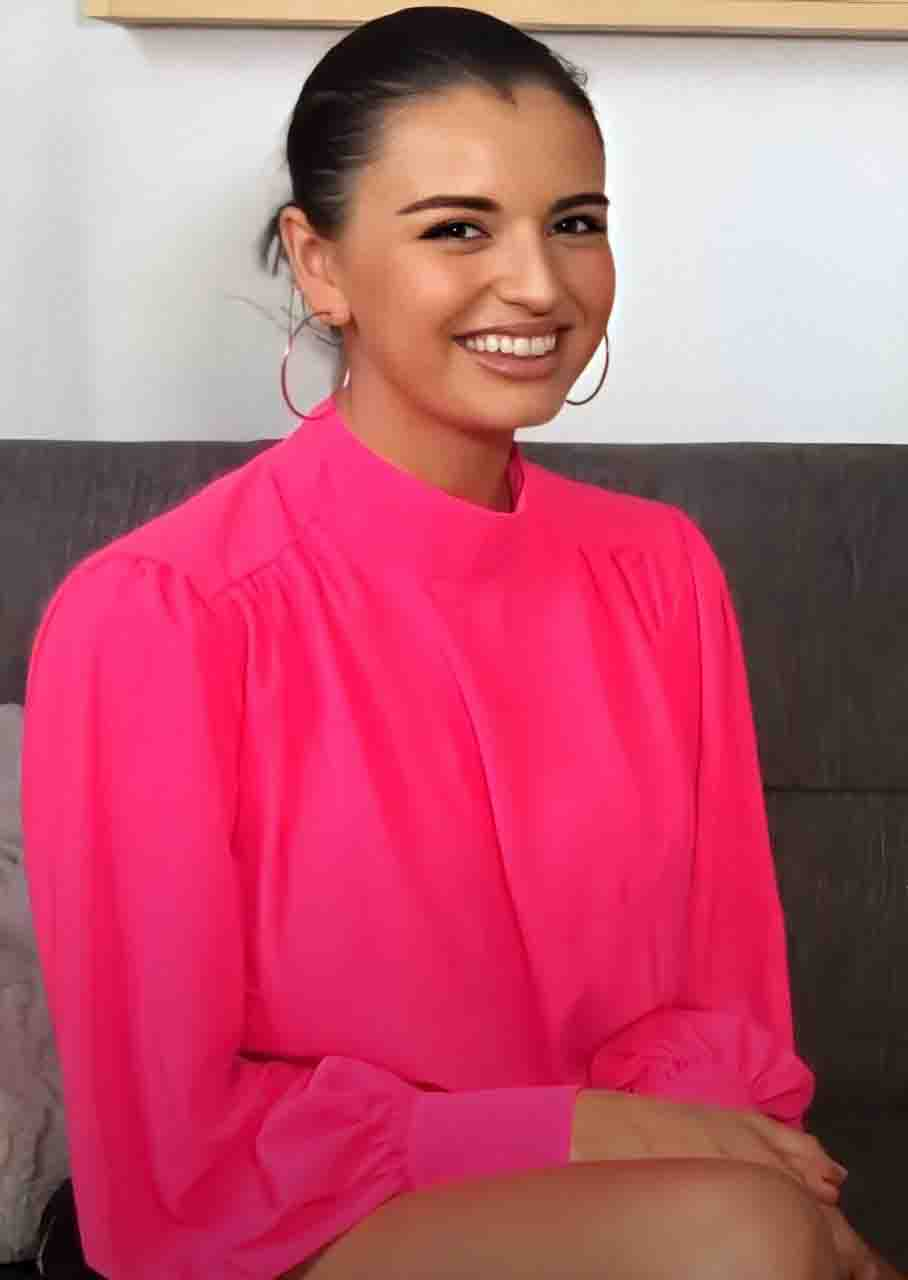
Rebecca Black from Friday

Friday is the debut single by American singer Rebecca Black. It was written and produced by Los Angeles record producers Clarence Jey and Patrice Wilson. The song's music video was released on February 10, 2011. The original music video was removed from YouTube on June 16, 2011, due to legal disputes between ARK Music and Black. By then, it had already amassed more than 167 million views. The video was later re-uploaded to YouTube on September 16, 2011. The music video for the song is one of the most disliked YouTube videos of all time. (Note: Friday (Rebecca Black song):)

=== EL FUA ===
El FUA is an Internet meme involving a viral YouTube video of an intoxicated Mexican man called Julio César Segura, who claims to have divine powers, including fortune-telling and revival of the dead. El Fua became popular after an online news program, Nayarit en Línea, from Nayarit, Mexico, uploaded the video to YouTube. (Note: El Fua:)

=== Hot Cross Buns 1 ===
Hot Cross Buns is a Channel 101 and YouTube Internet video published on October 29, 2011. Hot Cross Buns was originally uploaded to Channel 101 on October 29, 2011. It was uploaded to YouTube the next day. (Note: Hot Cross Buns (film):)

=== Jennifer Aniston Goes Viral - Smartwater ===
Jennifer Aniston Goes Viral is a viral video advertisement by Glacéau, starring actress Jennifer Aniston, that promotes the smartwater bottled water brand. The video was uploaded to YouTube on 7 March 2011 and had attracted almost ten and a half million views before it was taken down in February 2012. (Note: Jennifer Aniston Goes Viral:)

=== Life in a Day ===
Life in a Day is a crowd-sourced documentary film comprising an arranged series of video clips selected from 80,000 clips submitted to the YouTube video sharing website, the clips showing respective occurrences from around the world on a single day, 24 July 2010. The premiere was streamed live on YouTube. On 31 October 2011, YouTube announced that Life in a Day would be available for viewing on its website free of charge, and on DVD. (Note: Life in a Day (2011 film):)

=== Nek Minute ===
Nek minnit is an Internet meme made popular by New Zealand skateboarder Levi Hawken. Hawken appeared in a viral video which shows a scooter, apparently destroyed outside a dairy. The "nek minnit" video spawned many parodies and has become a popular slang term among the people of New Zealand. (Note: Nek minnit:)

=== Nyan Cat ===
Nyan Cat is a YouTube video uploaded in April 2011, which became an Internet meme. The video merged a Japanese pop song with an animated cartoon cat with a Pop-Tart for a torso flying through space and leaving a rainbow trail behind. The video ranked at number five on the list of most viewed YouTube videos in 2011. (Note: Nyan Cat:)

=== Portal: No Escape ===
Portal: No Escape is a short fan film based on the Portal video game series directed by Dan Trachtenberg. The film was released on August 23, 2011. As of July 2022, the video has received over 27 million views. The video was later featured on VentureBeat's "Top 10 Best Gaming Videos of 2011" list. (Note: Portal – No Escape:)

=== stari obrazi ===
The 2011 Slovenian YouTube incident was the publication of three clips of the recordings of closed sessions of the Government of Slovenia on the video-sharing website YouTube on 3 December 2011. The clips were published under the title Stari obrazi by someone who signed himself as stariobrazi (oldfaces). The publication happened during the term of the Prime Minister Borut Pahor, just before the early 2011 Slovenian parliamentary election on 4 December. (Note: 2011 Slovenian YouTube incident:)

=== Ti kto takoy, davay dosvidaniya! ===
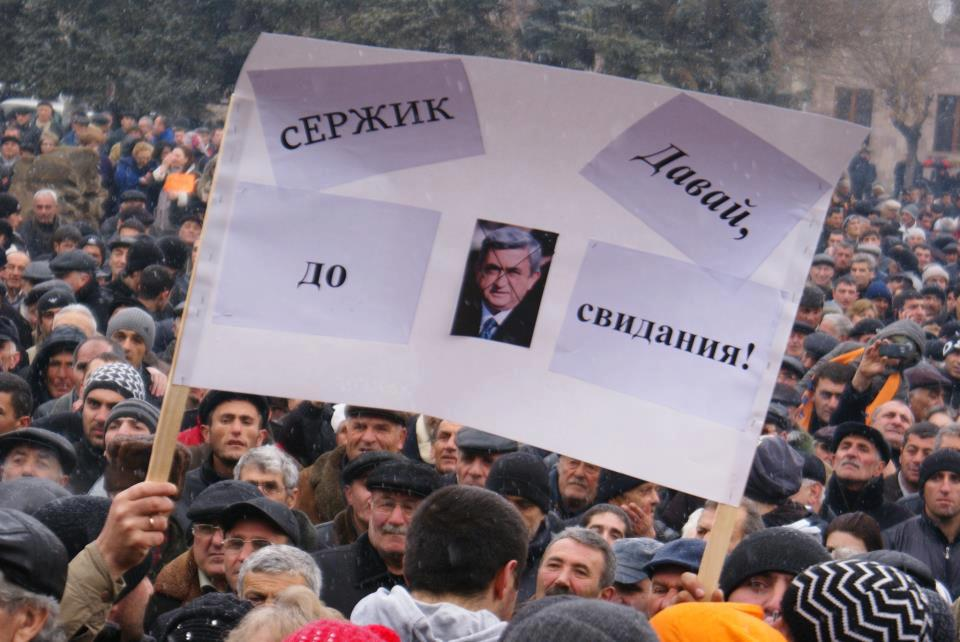
A poster during the 2013 Armenian presidential election protests depicting President-elect Serzh Sargsyan and the line Ty kto takoy? Davay, do svidaniya!

Ty kto takoy? Davay, do svidaniya! is a title of the viral video, showing meykhana performance with repeating hook in Russian: "Ty kto takoy? Davay, do svidaniya!" by two brothers Intigam and Ehtiram Rustamov from Azerbaijan. The video was filmed on 5 November 2011 at a wedding in Tangarud, Azerbaijan and as of August 2024 it was viewed over 25 million times on YouTube. It is sung in the form of flyting between Talysh and Baku groups in Azerbaijani, Talysh and Russian languages. The video was also viewed over 10 million times at theinstv, the YouTube channel of Insanity TV. (Note: Ty kto takoy? Davay, do svidaniya!:)

=== We Solve the Crime ===
We Solve the Crime is a Channel 101 and YouTube Internet video published on July 30, 2011. In 2011, writer Brian Wysol created a series of shorts for Dan Harmon and Rob Schrab's Channel 101 including Hot Cross Buns and We Solve the Crime. We Solve the Crime was originally uploaded to Channel 101 on July 30, 2011. Later, it was uploaded to YouTube on July 31, 2011. (Note: We Solve the Crime:)

=== YouTube Copyright School ===
YouTube Copyright School is a video of the American adult animated series Happy Tree Friends created for YouTube. It was uploaded by the official YouTube channel on March 24, 2011. It is created for YouTube users who infringe copyright for the first time, which results in their first "copyright strike." Afterwards, the user is sent to Copyright School, which contains the video along with a quiz where they need to answer a few questions. (Note: YouTube Copyright School:)

=== Muammar Gaddafi - Zenga Zenga Song - Noy Alooshe Remix ===
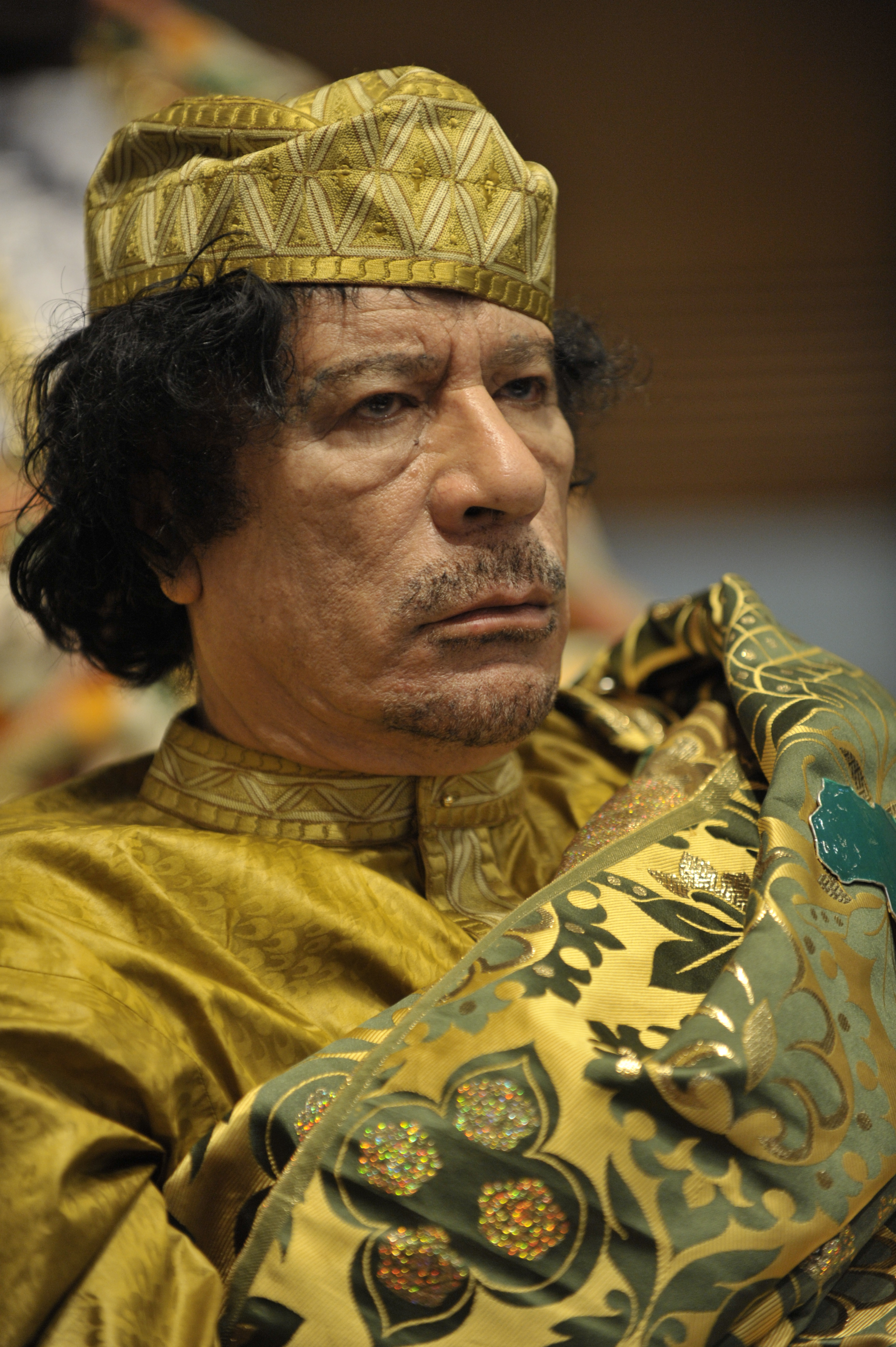
Muammar Gaddafi from Zenga Zenga

Zenga Zenga is an auto-tuned song and viral YouTube video that parodied the Libyan leader Muammar Gaddafi. The song, released on February 22, 2011, quickly became popular among the Libyan opposition active in the 2011 Libyan civil war. The song was created by Noy Alooshe, an Israeli journalist and musician. The original video has more than 6 million views and the edited "clean" version has surpassed 1 million hits. (Note: Zenga Zenga:)

== 2012 ==
=== Sweet Brown on apartment fire: "Ain't Nobody Got Time for That!" ===
Ain't Nobody Got Time for That is a viral YouTube video of Kimberly "Sweet Brown" Wilkins being interviewed after having escaped a fire in an apartment complex. It originally aired on April 8, 2012, on Oklahoma City NBC affiliate KFOR-TV.The video garnered Sweet Brown many appearances on television, including a visit to ABC's The View. (Note: Ain't Nobody Got Time for That:)

=== Arrest of Vladimir Putin: A Report from the Courtroom ===
Arrest of Vladimir Putin: A Report from the Courtroom (Aрест Владимира Путина: репортаж из зала суда) is a viral video, originally posted on YouTube on February 13, 2012, by the Russian video publishing group "Lancelot". The mock video shows then-Russian Prime Minister Vladimir Putin facing a courtroom trial. The footage was taken from the real-life trial of Mikhail Khodorkovsky and then digitally altered to make a faux news report. Putin's reply to the judge is taken from television footage where Putin is participating in the 2010 census. (Note: Arrest of Vladimir Putin: A Report from the Courtroom:)

=== Making The Bus Monitor Cry ===
Making The Bus Monitor Cry is one of three videos filmed in June 2012 which focused on a bus monitor, who was targeted for bullying by four seventh graders attending Greece Athena Middle School. The video went viral and received numerous video responses and news coverage. A donation campaign was launched for the victim. (Note: Bus monitor bullying video:)

=== The Death and Return of Superman ===
The Death and Return of Superman is a fan film released in 2012 on YouTube, by Chronicle writer Max Landis. The film, as its title implies, is a monologue about "The Death and Return of Superman" storyline from DC Comics over parody-like sketches. The film was produced by Bryan Basham, creator of COPS: Skyrim. (Note: The Death and Return of Superman:)

=== Dumb Ways to Die ===
Dumb Ways to Die is an Australian public awareness campaign video and media franchise made by Metro Trains in Melbourne, Victoria to promote railway safety. The original cartoon public service announcement for the awareness campaign went viral on social media after it was released on the internet in November 2012, amassing over 320 million views on YouTube. (Note: Dumb Ways to Die:)

=== PSY - GANGNAM STYLE(강남스타일) M/V ===
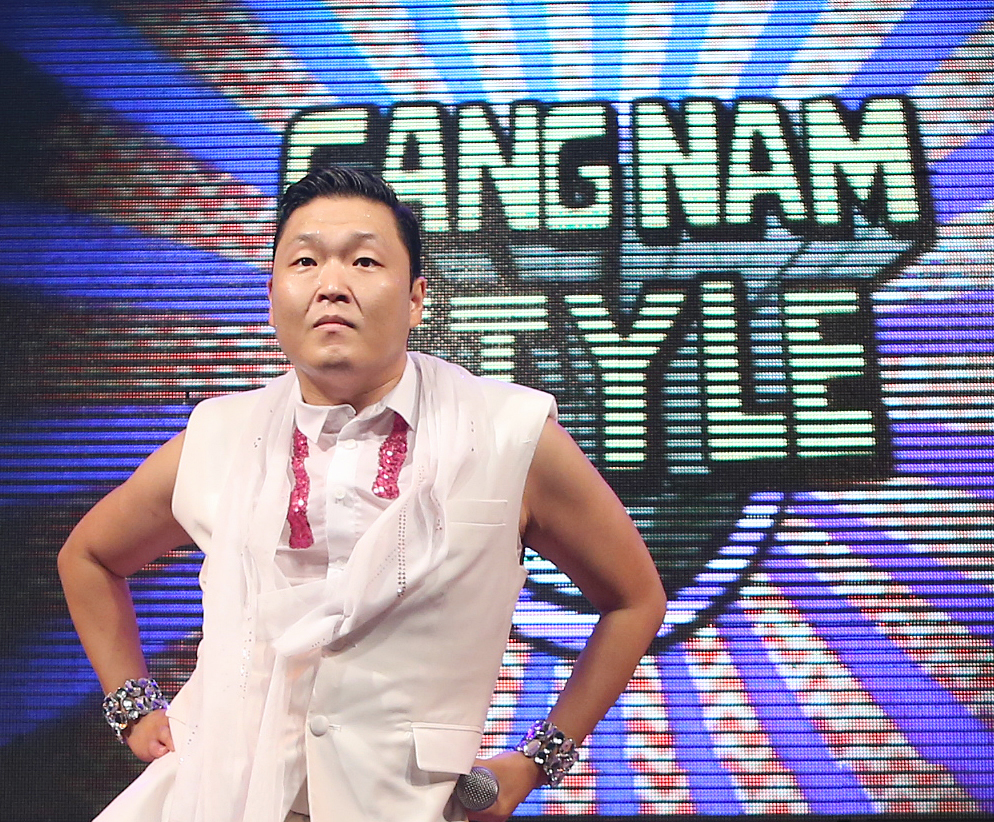
Park Jae-sang from Gangnam Style

Gangnam Style is made by South Korean singer Psy premiered on July 15, 2012, on the video-sharing website YouTube and was later made available to download digitally on October 19. It was directed by Cho Soo-hyun and was filmed in Seoul in July 2012 over the course of 48 hours. In the video, Psy "pokes fun at the style of Seoul's Gangnam District, a flashy district known for its affluence, high rents, high expectations and a focus on the high-status lifestyle". The video is currently the tenth most-viewed video and the eleventh most-liked video on YouTube, as well as the 19th most-disliked. On December 21, 2012, the music video set a record for the first video to surpass 1 billion views on the platform. (Note: Gangnam Style (music video):)

=== Double Take - "Hot Problems" ===
Hot Problems is a YouTube released on April 15, 2012, by Garrett and Willey. At the time of the single's release, both girls were attending San Luis Obispo High School. The video was produced by Connor Abrams and posted onto his Old Bailey Productions channel. Abrams stated he produced the video as a favor for one of his friends' younger siblings. The video quickly went viral, accumulating over one million views within its first three days. (Note: Hot Problems:)

=== How I Accidentally Wrote *The Office* Theme Song ===
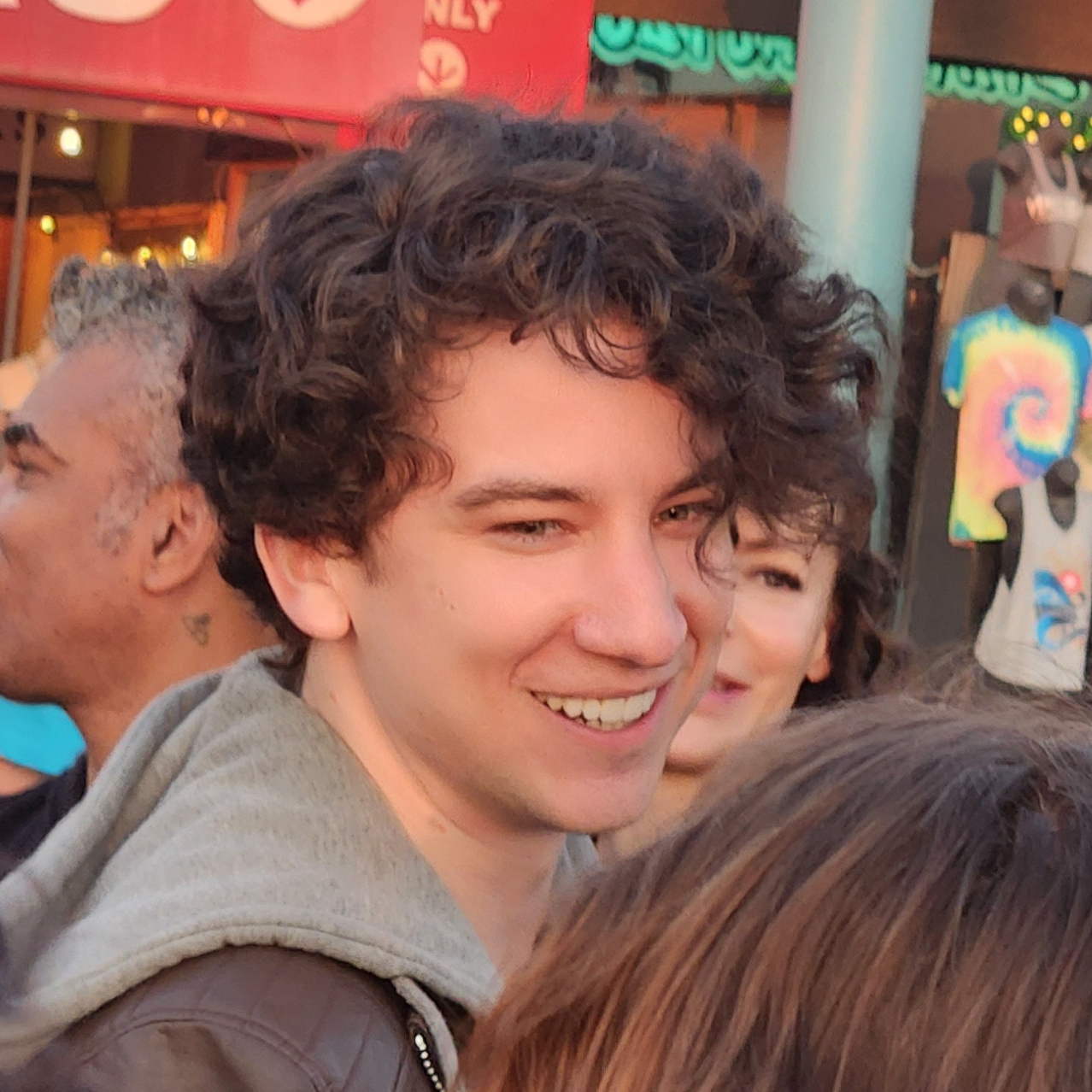
Daniel Thrasher from How I Accidentally Wrote *The Office* Theme Song

How I Accidentally Wrote *The Office* Theme Song is a YouTube video by Daniel Thrasher and released on November 13, 2012, in the video he explains how, after he got a new piano, he was testing a chord progression that sounded familiar, before he realized it was the theme song of The Office. A few years later, when Thrasher was in college, the video went viral, and as of April 2024 has over 22 million views and is the fourth most-viewed video on his channel. (Note: Daniel Thrasher:)

=== Muhammad Movie Trailer ===
Innocence of Muslims is a 2012 anti-Islamic short film that was written and produced by Nakoula Basseley Nakoula. Two versions of the 14-minute video were uploaded to YouTube in July 2012, under the titles "The Real Life of Muhammad" and "Muhammad Movie Trailer". Videos dubbed in Arabic were uploaded during early September 2012. Anti-Islamic content had been added in post-production by dubbing, without the actors' knowledge. (Note: Innocence of Muslims:)

=== Kickalicious™ ===
Kickalicious™ is a video posted by Rugland onto YouTube On September 16, 2012, under the name "bighdeluxe". After the video went viral, Rugland traveled to San Diego to train with retired NFL kicker Michael Husted. In December 2012, the New York Jets hosted a tryout for Rugland. In March 2013, Rugland worked out for the Cleveland Browns and the Lions, who later signed him in April. He competed with David Akers for the starting spot. (Note: Kickalicious™:)

=== KONY 2012 ===
Kony 2012 is a 2012 American short documentary film produced by Invisible Children, Inc. The film's purpose was to make Ugandan cult leader, war criminal, and ICC fugitive Joseph Kony globally known so as to have him arrested by the end of 2012. The film was released on March 5, 2012, and spread virally, and the campaign was initially supported by various celebrities. As of June 2024, the film had received over 103 million views and 1.3 million likes on the video-sharing website YouTube. (Note: Kony 2012:)

=== Live Action Toy Story ===
Live Action Toy Story is a Shot-for-shot remake of Toy Story produced by the Arizona-based Jonason Pauley and Jesse Perrotta. It is an unofficial recreation and remake of the 1995 animated film Toy Story, with the toy characters animated through stop-motion or filmed moving with wires and strings. Upon its release in 2013, Live Action Toy Story was covered by many media outlets, which claimed it to be "a crown jewel in the fan-made tribute video community." It garnered more than 250,000 views in 24 hours and reached 1.7 million views within two days before surpassing the three million mark on its third day. (Note: Live Action Toy Story:)

=== Why I Hate Religion, But Love Jesus II Spoken Word ===
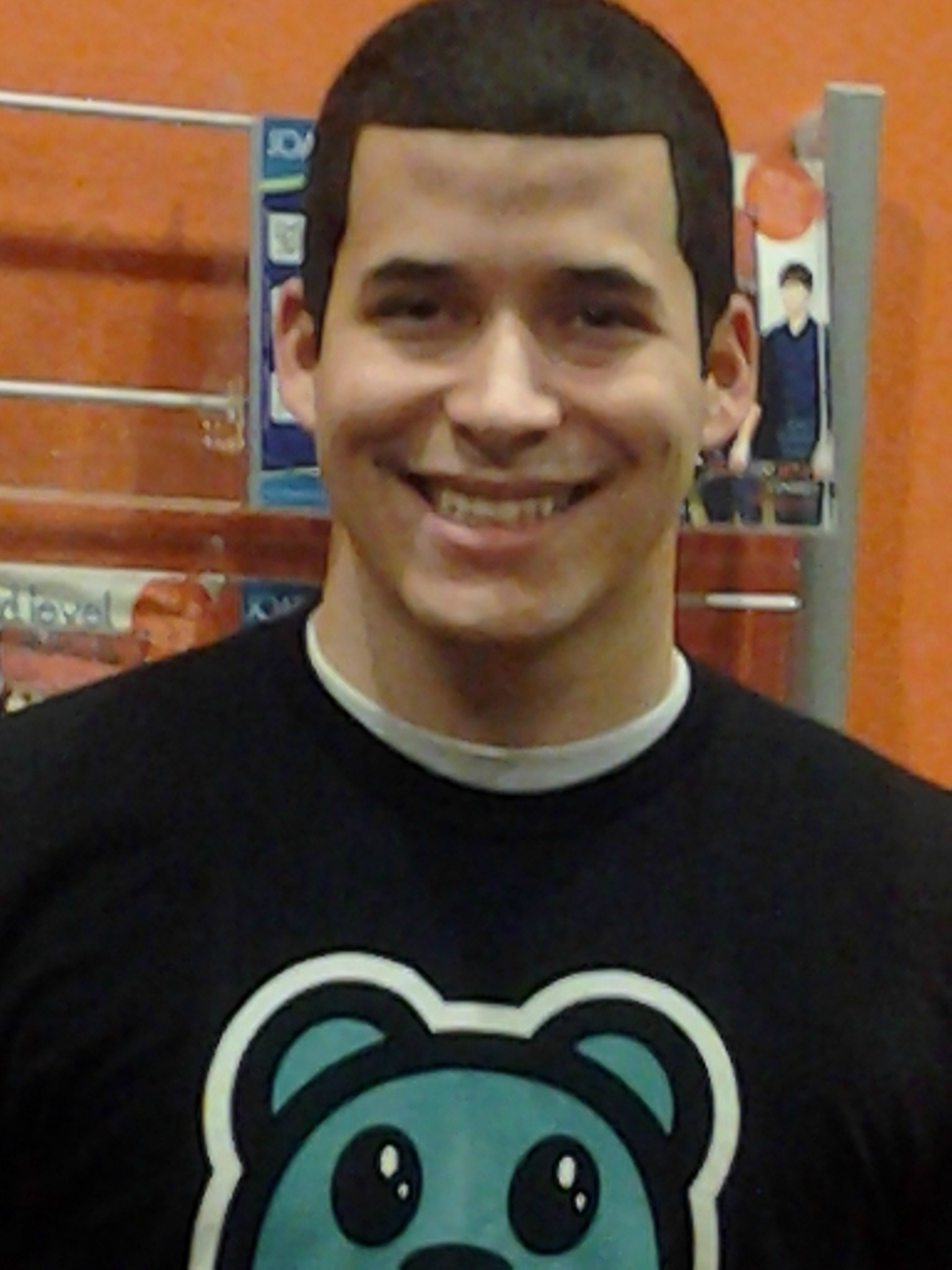
Jefferson Bethke from Why I Hate Religion, But Love Jesus

Why I Hate Religion, But Love Jesus is a viral video created by Christian speaker Jefferson Bethke, who uploaded his work that rose him to fame onto YouTube and GodTube, under the screenname bball1989. The video has thus far received more than 34 million views. (Note: Why I Hate Religion, But Love Jesus:)

== 2013 ==
=== Ylvis - The Fox (What Does The Fox Say?) ===
The Fox (What Does the Fox Say?) is an electronic dance novelty song and viral video by Norwegian comedy duo Ylvis. The top trending video of 2013 on YouTube, "The Fox" was posted on the platform on 3 September 2013, and has received over 1.1 billion views as of October 2024. (Note: The Fox (What Does the Fox Say?):)

=== I Will Not Let an Exam Result Decide My Fate ===
I Will Not Let an Exam Result Decide My Fate is a 2013 video by English spoken word poet Suli Breaks. The video tells the story of a mother and son who have just been to a parents' evening at school. Suli Breaks chastises parents, teachers, and the government for focusing on exams instead of nurturing raw talent. (Note: I Will Not Let an Exam Result Decide My Fate:)

=== AIB : Rape - It's Your Fault ===
It's Your Fault is a 2013 satirical video starring Kalki Koechlin and VJ Juhi Pandey that deals with the issue of rape in India. It went viral on the internet, with over 5,500,000 views on YouTube. It was created by All India Bakchod. The video, posted on 19 September 2013, went viral on almost all social networking sites. AIB has received many requests to dub the video into other languages so it can reach wider audiences. (Note: It's Your Fault (video):)

=== Kai, Hatchet Wielding Hitchhiker, Amazing Interview w/ Jessob Reisbeck ===
Kai the Hatchet-Wielding Hitchhiker is an internet viral video which featured him recounting a crime he witnessed while hitchhiking. McGillvary subsequently received national attention in the press. In 2019, McGillvary was convicted of murder in New Jersey. He cited the fallout from the video as part of his defense against the homicide charge. (Note: Kai the Hitchhiker:)

=== Pepsi Max Camaro Jeff Gordon Commercial Test Drive ===
Pepsi Max & Jeff Gordon Present: Test Drive is a 2013 short film produced by Gifted Youth, the commercial division of Funny or Die. The film was directed by Peter Atencio and stars NASCAR driver Jeff Gordon. The film served as part of a viral marketing advertising campaign to promote Pepsi Max. The film was released through Pepsi's YouTube channel on March 12, 2013. It quickly became a viral video, and earned more than 45 million views on YouTube as of March 2016. (Note: Pepsi Max & Jeff Gordon Present: Test Drive:)

=== Rappin' for Jesus ===
Rappin' for Jesus is a 2013 viral music video. It was purportedly written for a Christian youth outreach program in Dubuque, Iowa, by Pastor Jim Colerick and his wife Mary Sue, but is generally thought to be a hoax or parody. (Note: Rappin' for Jesus:)

=== Lily's Disneyland Surprise....AGAIN! ===
Lily's Disneyland Surprise….AGAIN! is a 2013 YouTube video. The video shows two sisters, Lily and Chloe Clem, reacting to the news of a surprise trip to Disneyland on Lily's way to school. As the older sister, Lily, breaks into tears of joy, Chloe is briefly seen on camera with a disturbed look on her face. The video is a follow-up to a similar video released two years earlier, which went viral, having over 19 million views as of February 2021. (Note: Side Eyeing Chloe:)

== 2014 ==
=== 10 Hours of Walking in NYC as a Woman ===
10 Hours of Walking in NYC as a Woman is an October 2014 video created for Hollaback! by Rob Bliss Creative featuring 24-year-old actress Shoshana Roberts. The video shows Roberts walking through various neighborhoods of New York City, wearing jeans, a black crewneck T-shirt, with a hidden camera recording her from the front. The two-minute video includes selected footage from ten hours, showcasing what has been described as "catcalls" and street harassment of Roberts by men following her for several minutes. As of September 2021, the video has received over 50 million views on YouTube. (Note: 10 Hours of Walking in NYC as a Woman:)

=== Elliot Rodger's Retribution ===
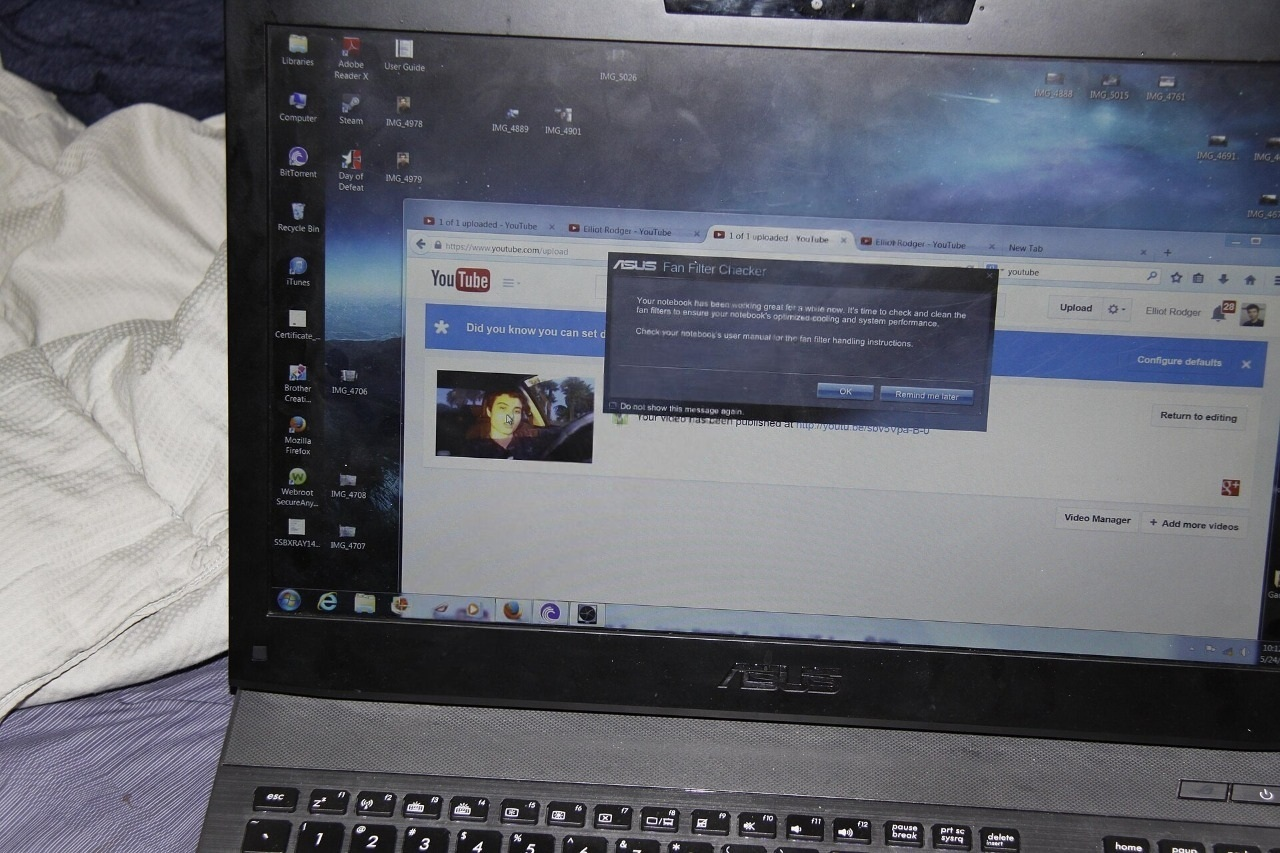
Screenshot of Elliot Rodger's Retribution video confirming it was uploaded on YouTube

Elliot Rodger's Retribution is a video by the American mass murderer Elliot Rodger. Filmed on May 22, Rodger uses his iPhone to record the video. In the video Rodger is seen from behind the wheel of his black BMW coupe. In it, Rodger announced his intention to "punish" women—as well as the men to whom they were attracted—for their lack of interest in him. On May 23, 2014, Rodger murdered six people and injured fourteen others using knives, semi-automatic pistols, and his car as a weapon in Isla Vista near the University of California, Santa Barbara (UCSB). Minutes before starting his planned attacks, he emailed his manifesto to thirty-four people and uploaded the seven-minute video to YouTube. (Note: Elliot Rodger#Online activity:)

=== Flames of War ===
Flames of War (لهيب الحرب,) is a film by the Islamic State, produced by Al-Hayat Media Center and narrated (the English version of it) by Mohammed Khalifa published in 2014. The trailer and all advertisements were spread heavily through Twitter (now X), JustPaste.it, and YouTube with one video getting 18,034 views within seven hours on 18 September 2014. (Note: Flames of War: The Fighting Has Just Begun:)

=== From the Doctor to My Son Thomas ===
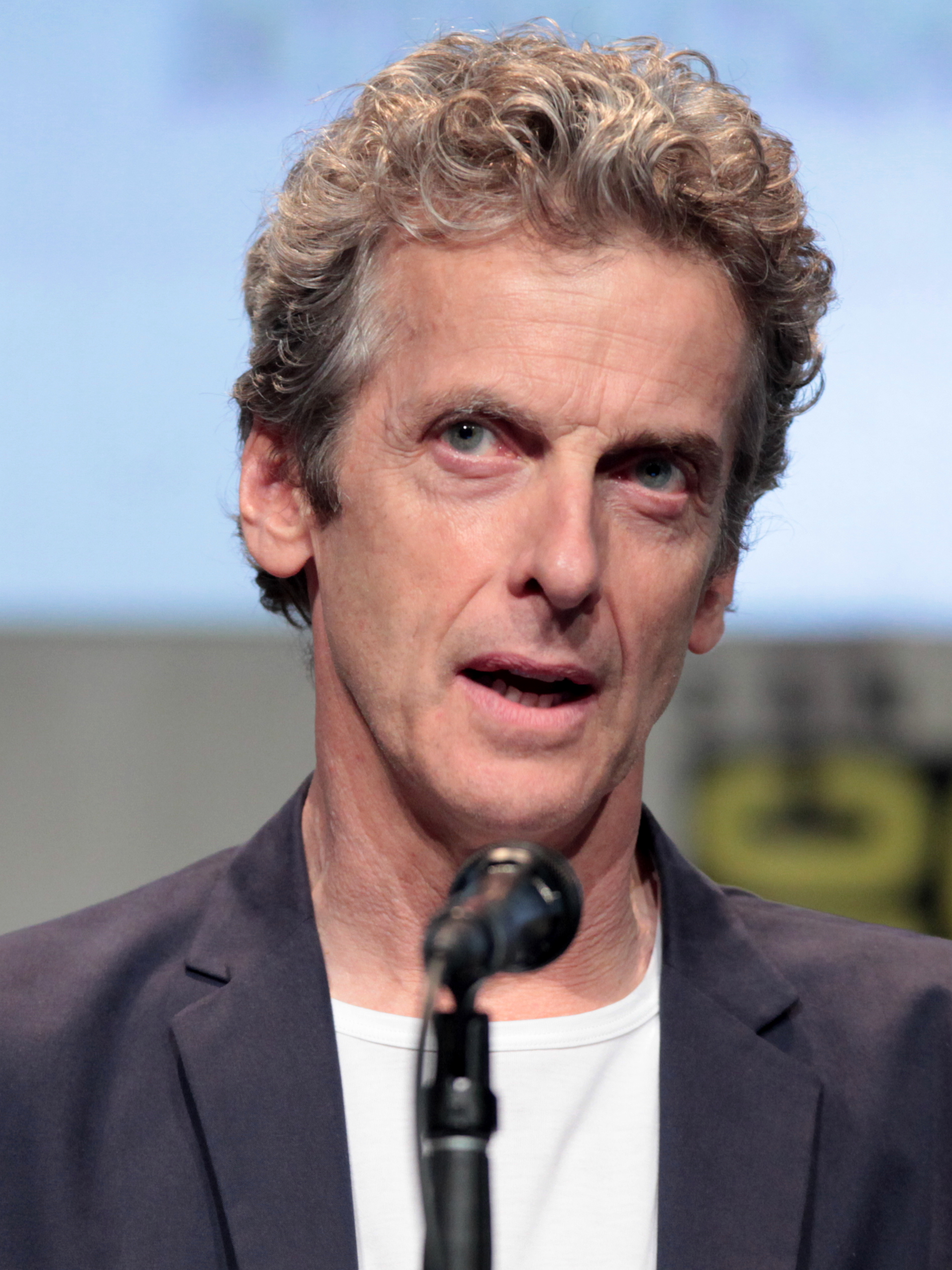
Peter Capaldi from the video From the Doctor to My Son Thomas

From the Doctor to My Son Thomas is a viral video recorded by actor Peter Capaldi and sent to Thomas Goodall, an autistic nine-year-old boy in England, to console the child over grief from the death of Goodall's grandmother. Capaldi filmed the 42-second video in character as the Twelfth Doctor from the BBC science-fiction series Doctor Who. Capaldi's message had a positive effect on Thomas: he smiled for the first time since learning of his grandmother's death, and gained the courage to go to her funeral. (Note: From the Doctor to My Son Thomas:)

=== Gay Mountain | Channel 4 ===
Gay Mountain is a 90-second video created for UK broadcaster Channel 4 by its in-house advertising agency 4Creative. It first aired across all of Channel 4's television channels on the day of the official opening of the Sochi 2014 Winter Olympics, 7 February 2014, having been released on YouTube the previous night, on 6 February 2014. Within 48 hours of its online release it had accumulated over half a million views. (Note: Gay Mountain:)

=== How Not to React When Your Child Tells You That He's Gay ===
How Not to React When Your Child Tells You That He's Gay is a YouTube video filmed on 26 August 2014 which focused on a gay man from Georgia named Daniel Ashley Pierce being disowned by his Christian family due to his sexual orientation. The video was removed from YouTube due to violating YouTube's hate speech policy. (Note: How Not to React When Your Child Tells You That He's Gay:)

=== Humans Need Not Apply ===
Humans Need Not Apply is a 2014 internet video directed, produced, written, and edited by CGP Grey. It focuses on the future of the integration of automation into economics, as well as the impact of this integration to the worldwide workforce. It was released online on YouTube on 13 August 2014. It was later made available via iTunes and RSS. (Note: Humans Need Not Apply:)

=== The Hunger Games Musical | Studio C ===
The Hunger Games Musical is a series of three music videos parodying The Hunger Games. Created by sketch comedy series Studio C, the videos feature original songs and focus on the love triangle between Hunger Games main characters Katniss Everdeen, Peeta Mellark, and Gale Hawthorne. The music videos were released on October 30, 2014, ahead of the November 21, 2014 release of The Hunger Games: Mockingjay – Part 1. The videos collectively surpassed a million views by late November. (Note: The Hunger Games Musical:)

=== I Am a Ukrainian ===
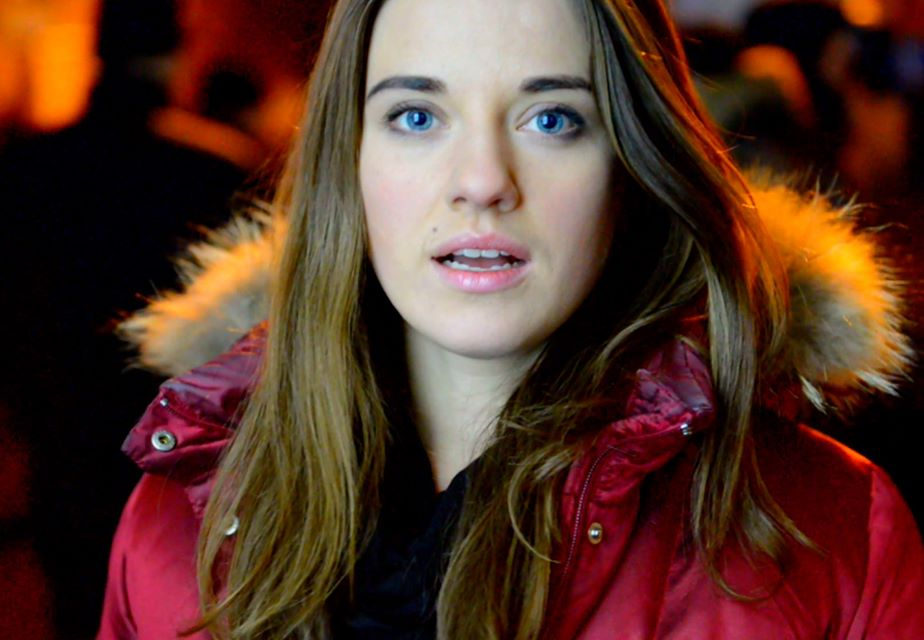
Screenshot from I Am a Ukrainian

I Am a Ukrainian is an Internet viral video, first posted on YouTube in 2014 featuring a young Ukrainian woman supporting the protestors in the 2014 Ukrainian revolution. At the woman's request, British photographer Graham Mitchell filmed her speaking on the Maidan, and her friend, Ben Moses, edited the material into video he posted on her behalf on YouTube. By late March that year the video had been viewed over 8 million times. (Note: I Am a Ukrainian:)

=== Mutant Giant Spider Dog (SA Wardega) ===
Mutant Giant Spider Dog is a YouTube video that went viral with more than 184 million views in 2014. The video was created by Polish YouTuber Sylwester Wardęga. The video features Wardęga's pet dog "Chica" wearing a large spider costume. Mutant Giant Spider Dog was the number one "top trending video" of 2014. As of December 2024, Wardęga's videos have garnered around 800 million views, while his channel has over 3.54 million subscribers. (Note: Mutant Giant Spider Dog:)

=== Nuggets ===
Nuggets is a 2014 animated short film and YouTube video created by German animation director Andreas Hykade. It was uploaded on 13 October 2014 onto the Filmbilder & Friends YouTube channel. Nuggets was covered by media outlets internationally. Nuggets achieved virality on YouTube, receiving over 3 million views in a little over a month following its release. As of September 2025, Nuggets has received over 31 million views. (Note: Nuggets (film):)

=== Shrek Is Love, Shrek Is Life ===
Shrek Is Love, Shrek Is Life is an adaptation of a story posted on 4chan describing a sexual encounter between a nine-year-old boy and Shrek after the boy's father reprimands him for his Shrek obsession. The Daily Dot described as a "whole new demented level", with a fanmade video called A metameme based on this was posted on 4chan's paranormal board on January 31, 2013, which led to many "deranged illustrations" posted online influenced by the post. Many duplications of the video were also uploaded, with the video and its replicas garnering over 90 million views as of May 2016. (Note: Shrek fandom#2012–present: ShrekChan, Shrek Is Love, Shrek Is Life:)

=== Sitting and Smiling #5 ===
Sitting and Smiling is an endurance art performance by Benjamin Bennett. In a typical performance, Bennett looks into a video camera recording him while sitting and smiling motionless for four hours. During the fifth stream, a burglar entered Bennett's home. After opening the door to Bennett's room, the burglar said, "Hello?" and then proceeded to shut the door and leave. This incident stacked attention online, and the video has over 8.4 million views. (Note: Sitting and Smiling:)

== 2015 ==
=== 11B-X-1371 ===
11B-X-1371 is a 2015 viral video sent to GadgetZZ.com, the Swedish tech blog that publicized it. The black-and-white segment is two minutes in length; its title came from the plaintext of a base64 string written on the DVD. It depicts a person wearing what appears to be a plague doctor costume walking and standing around in a dilapidated abandoned building, with a forest visible through former window openings in the wall behind it. Accompanied by a soundtrack of loud, discordant buzzing noise, the masked figure holds up a hand with an irregularly blinking light. The film did not have any credits or claims to authorship. (Note: 11B-X-1371:)

=== AIB Knockout Ft. Arjun Kapoor And Ranveer Singh ===
All India Bakchod Knockout (AIB Knockout) is a celebrity roast adaptation created by Mumbai based creative agency All India Bakchod (AIB). It was performed and filmed in December, 2014, and was uploaded on their YouTube channel on January 28, 2015. It was recorded at the NSCI Dome in Worli. It was hosted by Karan Johar, Ranveer Singh and Arjun Kapoor were roasted. The show was subsequently removed from their channel on February 3, 2015. (Note: All India Bakchod Knockout:)

=== Jasmine Masters AND I OOP ===
And I Oop is an internet meme in 2019. It originated from a 2015 YouTube video named "Jasmine Masters handle your liquor". According to Giphy, Masters' "And I Oop" was the most used gif of 2019, with over 419 million views. Masters also trademarked the term. (Note: Jasmine Masters:)

=== New York City rat taking pizza home on the subway (Pizza Rat™) ===
Pizza Rat is an internet meme based around a viral video of a brown rat carrying a slice of pizza down the steps of a New York City Subway station in Manhattan. The video was first uploaded to Instagram on September 21, 2015, and a copy was uploaded to YouTube later. As of September 2023, the YouTube video had more than 12.35 million views. (Note: Pizza Rat:)

=== What If Batman Was From Chennai? | Put Chutney ===
What If Batman Was From Chennai? is a 2015 satirical viral video that offers a take on what if Batman didn't live in Gotham City and instead in the fictional neighborhood of Batmanabhapuram in Chennai. The video shows Batman adapted to Indian standards including being part of a middle-class family, wearing a lungi, being compared to his family friend Srinivasan's son who has an IT job, and getting a speeding ticket. The video also shows Catwoman wearing a sari and a bindi. (Note: What If Batman Was From Chennai?:)

=== Wrestling Isn't Wrestling ===
Wrestling Isn't Wrestling is a 2015 short film written and directed by Max Landis. Released for free on YouTube, the film retells the story of WWE professional wrestler Triple H. Like Landis's 2012 short The Death and Return of Superman, it consists of a monologue by Landis on the subject matter, accompanied by sequences with actors performing the parts in the story. (Note: Wrestling Isn't Wrestling:)

== 2016 ==
=== Did Google Manipulate Search for Hillary? ===
Did Google Manipulate Search for Hillary? is a video by SourceFed, the video discuss whether or not Google manipulated search results to display Hillary Clinton in an untruthful positive light. This video was uploaded at the tailend of the primaries for the 2016 United States presidential election, with Clinton being the Democratic Party's presumptive nominee for President of the United States in the 2016 election. (Note: SourceFed:)

=== Hwages ===
Hwages (Arabic: هواجيس, lit. 'Concerns') is a viral music video by Saudi producer Majed al-Esa of 8ies Studios published in December 2016. The video features Saudi women wearing niqabs while skateboarding and riding scooters, while the song's lyrics address women's rights in Saudi Arabia and mocks the patriarchy as well as Donald Trump. The video was viewed over 3 million times. (Note: Hwages:)

=== Pen-Pineapple-Apple-Pen/PIKO-TARO ===
PPAP (Pen-Pineapple-Apple-Pen) (Japanese: ペンパイナッポーアッポーペン, Hepburn: Penpainappōappōpen) is a single by Pikotaro, a fictional singer-songwriter created and portrayed by Japanese comedian Daimaou Kosaka. It was released as a music video on YouTube on 25 August 2016, and has since become a viral video. As of February 2025, the official video has been viewed more than 173 million times. PPAP spawned parodies, and was hailed as the new "Gangnam Style" by various newspapers and online media. (Note: PPAP (Pen-Pineapple-Apple-Pen):)

=== SM64 - Watch for Rolling Rocks - 0.5x A Presses (Commentated) [OUTDATED] ===
Watch for Rolling Rocks - 0.5x A Presses is a commentated video in which he explains in depth how to complete the level, from the video game Super Mario 64. His strategy originally took 14.8 hours from start to finish, most of which were spent using a glitch to accelerate Mario to the high speeds necessary for "parallel universe" movement. This was reduced to 5.4 hours in 2017. The video became popular and was widely spoofed online for its incredibly obtuse and technical content, especially Buchanan's "half A-press" notation (meaning that he began the level with the A button already held down) and his use of parallel universes. (Note: pannenkoek2012:)

== 2017 ==
=== Don't call him "Dimon" ===
Don't Call Him Dimon is a 2017 Russian documentary film detailing the corruption of Dmitry Medvedev, who was Prime Minister of Russia at the time of release. The film estimates that $1.2 billion was embezzled by Dmitry Medvedev. He Is Not Dimon to You was posted on the YouTube channel on 2 March 2017. The video received about 1.5 million views in its first day. A week after, this increased to 7 million, exceeding the result of Chaika, another film by Alexei Navalny and the Anti-Corruption Foundation. By May 2019, the video reached 30 million views. Russian state-owned media and most of privately held media have completely ignored the controversial revelations. (Note: He Is Not Dimon to You:)

=== Luis Fonsi - Despacito ft. Daddy Yankee ===
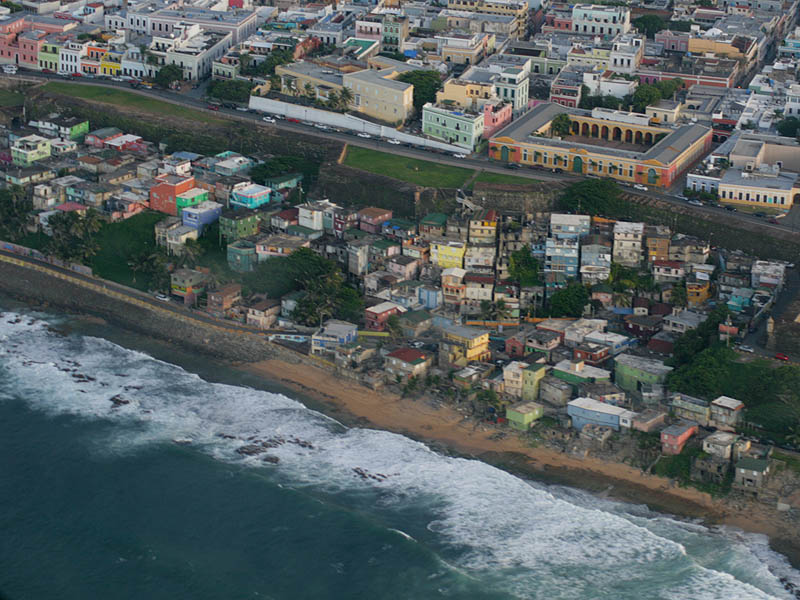
An aerial view of colorful La Perla in San Juan, from the music video.

"Despacito" is a song by Puerto Rican singer Luis Fonsi, originally written in 2015. In 2016, Luis sent the song to Puerto Rican rapper and singer Daddy Yankee to give it an "urban injection", and released it as the lead single from Fonsi's 2019 studio album Vida. It was the most-viewed YouTube video of all time from August 2017 to November 2020, and became the first video on the site to reach the milestones of three to eight billion views. The music video for "Despacito" was directed by Puerto Rican, Carlos Pérez and produced by Joanna Egozcue and Roxy Quiñones. The video shows both artists performing the song while participating on different parties on the island, featuring model Zuleyka Rivera. It also became the fastest video on YouTube to surpass two billion views, with 154 days. It has also received over 54 million likes as of January 2025, and was the site's most-liked video. (Note: Despacito:)

=== history of the entire world, i guess ===
Thumbnail of history of the entire world, i guess

history of the entire world, i guess is a 2017 video by Bill Wurtz, the 20-minute gives an overview of world history, uploaded on May 10, 2017. The video took over 11 months to produce, including almost three months of research. It briefly covers the topics of natural history and human civilization from the Big Bang to the near future. The video marked the continued development of Wurtz's style, with fast-paced, absurdist humor and jazz-like musical interludes. (Note: Bill Wurtz:)

=== In a Heartbeat - Animated Short Film ===
In a Heartbeat is a 2017 American animated short film produced by Ringling College of Art and Design. Written and directed by Esteban Bravo and Beth David, the project was funded through Kickstarter, raising $14,191 from 416 backers on a goal of $3,000. The short film concerns a closeted gay boy, Sherwin, who has a crush on another boy named Jonathan and his heart desires to be with him. The short received wide praise on various platforms and was shortlisted for an Academy Award for Best Animated Short Film. (Note: In a Heartbeat (film):)

=== Jake Paul - It's Everyday Bro (Song) feat. Team 10 (Official Music Video) ===
It's Everyday Bro is a song by American YouTube personality Jake Paul and his group Team 10, with team members Nick Crompton, Chance Sutton, Ivan and Emilio Martinez (Martinez Twins), and Tessa Brooks additionally rapping on the track. The song was released on May 30, 2017, along with the music video. The song is a diss track that took aim primarily at fellow American Vine personality and Paul's former girlfriend, Alissa Violet, who responded to the track by releasing "It's Every Night Sis" with YouTuber RiceGum. (Note: It's Everyday Bro:)

=== We found a dead body in the Japanese Suicide Forest... ===
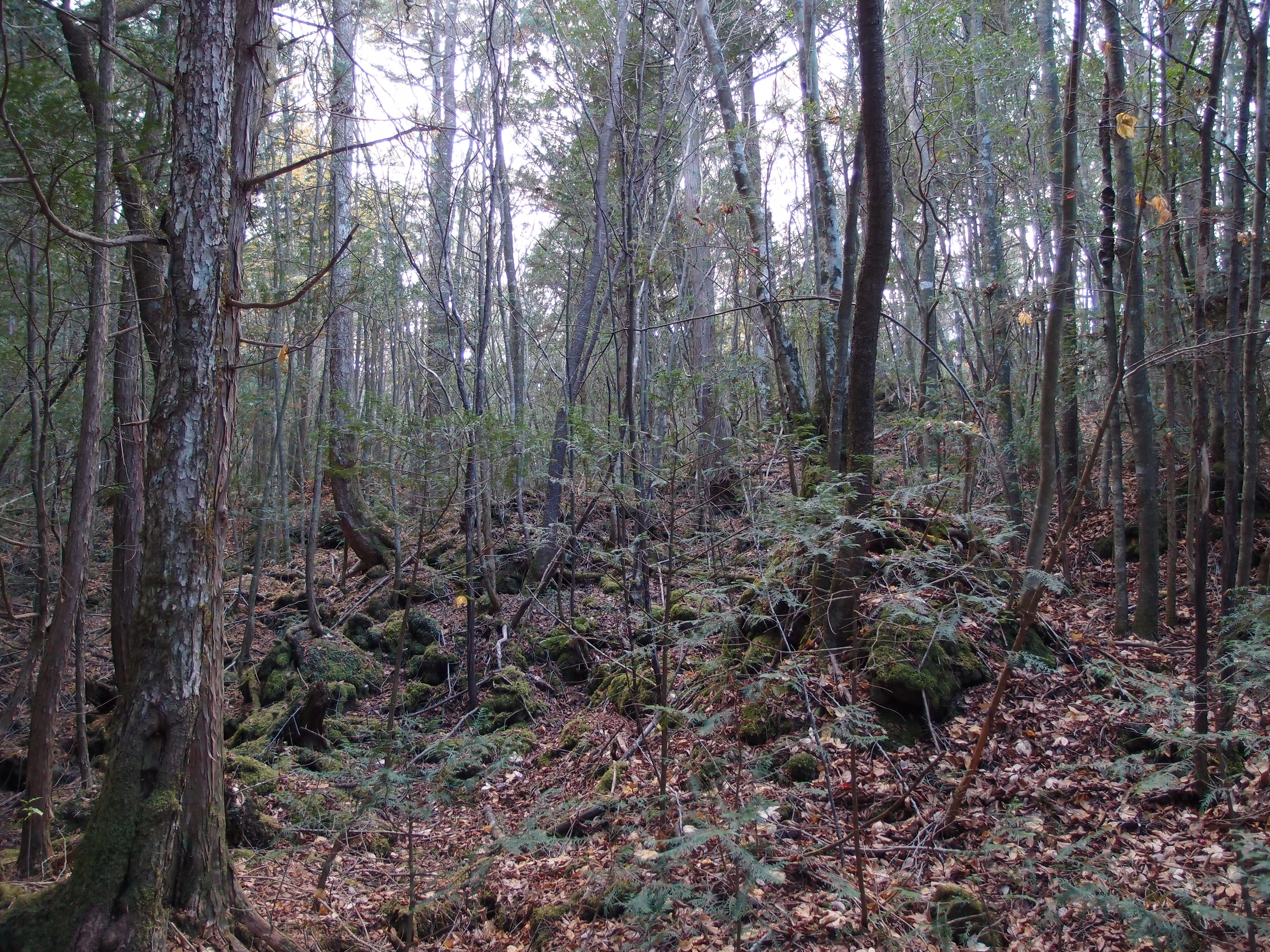
Aokigahara Forest from the We found a dead body in the Japanese Suicide Forest...

We found a dead body in the Japanese Suicide Forest... is a vlog uploaded by Logan Paul on December 31, 2017. The video shows a recently deceased corpse of a man who had died by hanging himself in Aokigahara at the base of Mount Fuji in Japan, known as the "suicide forest" due to its infamy as a suicide site. Initially intended to be part three of his "Tokyo Adventures" series, Paul and his group had planned to camp in the woods, but in response to finding the corpse, decided to notify the authorities and cancel their plans. The video gained 6.3 million views within 24 hours of being uploaded. Paul's video depicting the corpse, whose face was censored, and his group's reactions to it, were criticized by celebrities and politicians. (Note: Logan Paul#Suicide video controversy:)

== 2018 ==
=== bitch lasagna ===
Bitch Lasagna, originally named T-Series Diss Track, is a song by Swedish YouTuber PewDiePie in collaboration with Dutch music producer Party in Backyard. The song satirizes Indian company and music label T-Series, as a response to predictions that T-Series would surpass PewDiePie in terms of subscriber count. The song was one of the first events in the PewDiePie vs T-Series competition, in which the two channels competed for the title of the most-subscribed YouTube channel. (Note: Bitch Lasagna:)

=== Jordan Peterson debate on the gender pay gap, campus protests and postmodernism ===
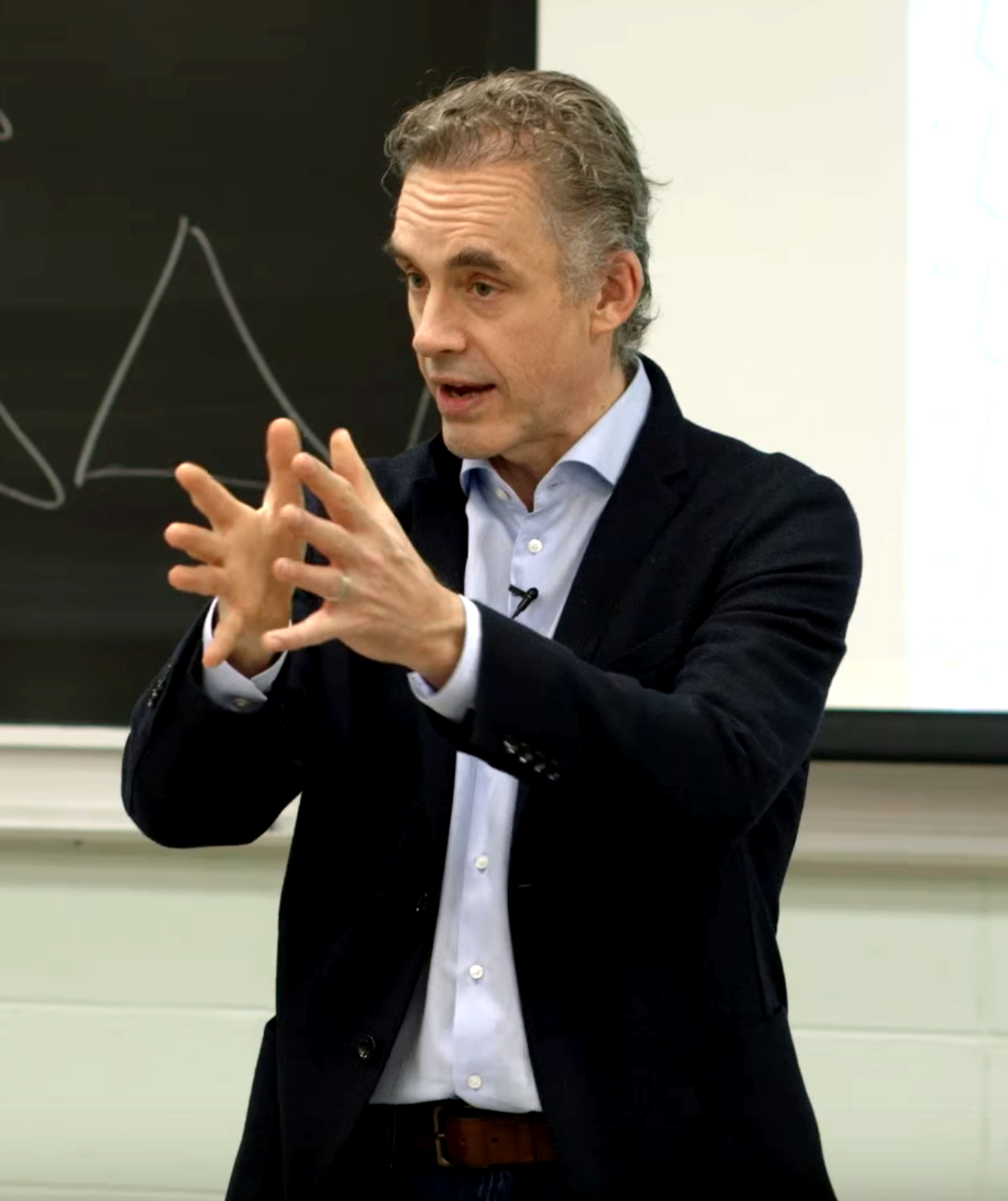
Jordan Peterson from Jordan Peterson debate on the gender pay gap, campus protests and postmodernism

Jordan Peterson debate on the gender pay gap, campus protests and postmodernism is a video by Channel 4 News. The video is an interview with Cathy Newman and Jordan Peterson. The interview covered topics such as gender equality, including the gender pay gap, freedom of speech, and transgender rights. Short clips, GIFs and memes of the fiery back-and-forth subsequently went viral, especially Newman's repeated use of the line "So you're saying..." an utterance made 35 times during the 29-minute interview. Many YouTube commenters were critical of Newman, a large number of them saying she had "a preconceived and misplaced grasp of Peterson's views", wrote Jamie Doward of The Guardian. New York Times columnist David Brooks criticized Newman for not listening to Peterson and for "distort[ing], simplif[ying] and restat[ing] his views to make them appear offensive and cartoonish". (Note: Cathy Newman#Jordan Peterson interview:)

=== Shrek Retold - Full Movie ===
Shrek Retold is a fan-made reanimated collab film based on the 2001 film Shrek, in turn based on the 1990 children's book by William Steig. Released on November 29, 2018, to YouTube, the project was led by YouTuber Grant Duffrin. It features the work of over 200 creators, each contributing to a portion of the recreation. (Note: Shrek Retold:)

=== YouTube Rewind 2018: Everyone Controls Rewind ===
YouTube Rewind 2018: Everyone Controls Rewind is a video that was uploaded to the official channel of the video-sharing website YouTube on December 6, 2018, as the ninth installment of the YouTube Rewind series. The video features references to video games and internet culture, starring YouTubers such as Ninja and Marques Brownlee, as well as celebrities like Will Smith and Trevor Noah. The video was panned by critics, YouTubers, and viewers alike, who dubbed it the worst YouTube Rewind video to date. (Note: YouTube Rewind 2018: Everyone Controls Rewind:)

== 2019 ==
=== Congratulations ===
Congratulations is a song by YouTubers PewDiePie, Roomie and Boyinaband. The single was self-released on 31 March 2019 with an accompanying music video on YouTube as a response to T-Series surpassing PewDiePie as the most-subscribed YouTube channel. The music video is banned on YouTube in India. As of January 2025, the video on YouTube has over 237 million views, making it PewDiePie's second most-viewed video, his most viewed being his previous T-Series diss track, "Bitch Lasagna". (Note: Congratulations (Roomie, PewDiePie, and Boyinaband song):)

=== Kitbull | Pixar SparkShorts ===
Kitbull is a 2019 American animated buddy-drama short film and viral video written and directed by Rosana Sullivan, produced by Pixar Animation Studios, and distributed by Walt Disney Studios Motion Pictures. It is the third film in Pixar's SparkShorts program, and focuses on a fiercely independent stray kitten and an abused pit bull, who form an unlikely friendship. The short premiered at El Capitan Theatre on January 18, 2019, before being released on YouTube on February 18, 2019, and has received over 100 million views as of August 2023. (Note: Kitbull:)

=== The destruction of the CDU ===
Die Zerstörung der CDU is the title of a video released on May 18, 2019, in the run-up to the 2019 European elections by the German YouTuber Rezo on YouTube. The video is 55 minutes long and is accompanied by a 13-page source list. It was viewed over ten million times in a week after airing. (Note: The destruction of the CDU:)

=== TIMELAPSE OF THE FUTURE: A Journey to the End of Time (4K) ===
Timelapse of the Future: A Journey to the End of Time is a 2019 short epic documentary film created by American astronomy-themed musician and filmmaker John D. Boswell, made as a follow-up to his other short film Timelapse of the Entire Universe. Running at 29 minutes, it is a flowmotion—a combination of a hyper-lapse, time-lapse, and regular shots—of the universe from 2019 to the end of time, with the lapse rate doubling every five seconds. The film consists of self-made and fair use footage from films, the Internet, and speeches by scientists, using current knowledge and combining different hypotheses. (Note: Timelapse of the Future:)

=== YouTube Rewind 2019: For the Record ===
YouTube Rewind 2019: For the Record is a video that was uploaded to YouTube's official channel on the video-sharing website YouTube on December 5, 2019, as the tenth and final installment of the YouTube Rewind series. The video contains montages of the top videos and YouTubers of the year. The video received negative reviews, with critics and the general audience finding the video uncreative in comparison to past Rewind videos. It currently has over 9.6 million dislikes, making it the sixth most-disliked video on YouTube. In December 2025, For the Record along with the other Rewind videos were set to unlisted on YouTube before subsequently being made private in January 2026. (Note: YouTube Rewind 2019: For the Record:)

== See also ==
- List of notable YouTube videos of the 2000s
- List of notable YouTube videos of the 2020s
- List of most-viewed YouTube videos
- List of viral videos
