= Hey Baby (Drop It to the Floor) =

2010 single by Pitbull

Single by Pitbull featuring T-Pain

from the album Planet Pit
- Released: September 14, 2010
- Recorded: 2009
- Genre: Electro house; Europop; hip house
- Length: 3:54
- Label: Polo Grounds; J; Mr. 305
- Songwriters: Armando C. Pérez; Faheem Najm; Sandy Wilhelm; Hurby Azor (uncredited); Ray Davies (uncredited)
- Producer: Sandy Vee

Pitbull singles chronology
"Bon, Bon" (2010)	"Hey Baby (Drop It to the Floor)" (2010)	"On the Floor" (2011)

T-Pain singles chronology
"Trillionaire" (2010)	"Hey Baby (Drop It to the Floor)" (2010)	"Rap Song" (2010)

Music video
- "Hey Baby (Drop It to the Floor)" on YouTube

"Hey Baby (Drop It to the Floor)" is a song by American rapper Pitbull featuring American singer T-Pain. It was released on September 14, 2010, as the lead single from Pitbull's sixth studio album Planet Pit. The song was written by the two said artists, and Sandy Vee; the latter is also the producer. The song interpolates the line "Ooh, baby, baby" from the 1987 song "Push It" by American hip hop group Salt-N-Pepa.

== Composition ==
The song has a tempo of 128 beats per minute.

== Critical reception ==
Amar Toor from Aol Radio Blog said that the song is "a pulsating rhythm and electrified beats, the track seems like it's tailor-made for South Beach's hottest dance floors. [...] Pitbull's reggaeton roots are evident throughout "Hey Baby", as a persistent, pulsating beat keeps the song grooving along, from start to finish. And as always, T-Pain puts his own indelible, Auto-Tuned stamp on the song, as he croons, "Hey Baby – you can be my girl I can be your man / And we can pump this jam however you want."

== Chart performance ==
"Hey Baby (Drop It to the Floor)" debuted at number 51 on the US Billboard Hot 100 on the week of October 16, 2010. Four months later, the song reached it peak number seven on the chart, giving Pitbull his third top ten hit. This is T-Pain's eighth top ten as a featured artist, and thirteenth overall. As of May 2011, the single sold over two million digital copies in the US. On October 16, 2020, the single was certified triple platinum by the Recording Industry Association of America (RIAA) for combined sales and streaming equivalent units of over three million units in the United States.

== Music video ==
According to an interview with Pitbull on MTV News, the music video was filmed in Miami and it was released on Pitbull's official VEVO channel on November 6, 2010. It features Pitbull and T-Pain at a club, along with scenes of girls in leather catsuits. Two of the girls are Nayer and Sagia Castañeda.

The video has received over 270 million views.

The song is also featured in one of the trailers to the 2012 movie The Dictator.

== Other versions ==
In February 2011, Noy Alooshe used the music from "Hey Baby (Drop It to the Floor)" as the basis for Zenga Zenga, an auto-tuned song and viral YouTube video that parodies Libyan ruler Muammar Gaddafi.

== Track listing ==
- German CD single
1. "Hey Baby (Drop It to the Floor)" (Album Version) – 3:54
2. "Hey Baby (Drop It to the Floor)" (Radio Edit) – 3:24
- Remixes
1. "Hey Baby (Drop It to the Floor)" (AJ Fire Remix; remixed by Afrojack) – 4:23
2. "Hey Baby (Drop It to the Floor)" (Sidney Samson Remix) – 5:48
3. "Hey Baby (Drop It to the Floor)" (Alvaro Remix) – 5:33
4. "Hey Baby (Drop It to the Floor)" (Big Syphe Remix) – 5:31
5. "Hey Baby (Drop It to the Floor)" (Kassiano's Brazilian Tribal Mix) – 5:29
6. "Hey Baby (Drop It to the Floor)" (MK Dub) – 5:44

== Personnel ==
- Songwriting – Armando C. Pérez, Faheem R. Najm, Sandy Vee
- Production, instruments and mixing – Sandy Vee
- Pitbull vocal recording – Al Burna
- T-Pain vocal recording – Javier Valverde

== Charts ==
=== Weekly charts ===
Chart (2010–2011)	Peak position
Australia (ARIA)	10
Austria (Ö3 Austria Top 40)	22
Belgium (Ultratop 50 Flanders)	24
Belgium (Ultratip Bubbling Under Flanders)	1
Belgium (Ultratop 50 Wallonia)	21
Belgium (Ultratip Bubbling Under Wallonia)	5
Canada Hot 100 (Billboard)	10
Canada CHR/Top 40 (Billboard)	9
CIS Airplay (TopHit)	3
Czech Republic Airplay (ČNS IFPI)	8
Denmark (Tracklisten)	19
Finland (Suomen virallinen lista)	4
France (SNEP)	24
Germany (GfK)	24
Global Dance Tracks (Billboard)	21
Hungary (Rádiós Top 40)	14
Ireland (IRMA)	32
Mexico Anglo (Monitor Latino)	7
New Zealand (Recorded Music NZ)	23
Poland (Dance Top 50)	10
Russia Airplay (TopHit)	1
Scottish Singles Sales (Official Charts)	31
Sweden (Sverigetopplistan)	17
Switzerland (Schweizer Hitparade)	21
UK Hip Hop/R&B (Official Charts)	4
UK Singles (Official Charts)	38
US Billboard Hot 100	7
US Adult Pop Airplay (Billboard)	36
US Hot Latin Songs (Billboard)	26
US Dance Airplay (Billboard)	10
US Pop Airplay (Billboard)	5
US Hot Rap Songs (Billboard)	8
US Rhythmic Airplay (Billboard)	13

2025–2026 weekly chart performance for "Hey Baby (Drop It to the Floor)"
Chart (2025–2026)	Peak position
Lithuania (AGATA)	14
Poland (Polish Streaming Top 100)	74

=== Year-end charts ===
Chart (2010)	Position
Australia (ARIA)	61
Russia Airplay (TopHit)	126
Sweden (Sverigetopplistan)	89

Chart (2011)	Position
Belgium (Ultratop Wallonia)	86
Canada (Canadian Hot 100)	41
France (SNEP)	74
Germany (Official German Charts)	95
Hungary (Rádiós Top 40)	61
Russia Airplay (TopHit)	11
Sweden (Sverigetopplistan)	59
Switzerland (Schweizer Hitparade)	66
US Billboard Hot 100	39
US Mainstream Top 40 (Billboard)	32
US Rhythmic (Billboard)	33

== Certifications ==
Region	Certification	Certified units/sales
Australia (ARIA)	3× Platinum	210,000^{‡}
Austria (IFPI Austria)	Gold	15,000^{*}
Canada (Music Canada)	3× Platinum	240,000^{*}
Denmark (IFPI Danmark)	Gold	45,000^{‡}
Germany (BVMI)	Gold	150,000^{‡}
Mexico (AMPROFON)	Platinum	60,000^{*}
New Zealand (RMNZ)	Platinum	15,000^{*}
Norway (IFPI Norway)	4× Platinum	40,000^{*}
Sweden (GLF)	3× Platinum	120,000^{‡}
Switzerland (IFPI Switzerland)	Gold	15,000^{^}
United Kingdom (BPI)	Gold	400,000^{‡}
United States (RIAA)	5× Platinum	5,000,000^{‡}
^{*} Sales figures based on certification alone.^{^} Shipments figures based on certification alone.^{‡} Sales+streaming figures based on certification alone.

== Release history ==
Release dates and formats for "Hey Baby (Drop It to the Floor)"
Region	Date	Format	Label(s)	Ref.
United States	October 19, 2010	Mainstream airplay	J	
