= Death on the Job =

1991 film

- Directed by: Vince DiPersio; Bill Guttentag
- Written by: Bill Guttentag
- Produced by: Bill Guttentag; Nonny de la Peña
- Narrated by: Joe Mantegna
- Distributed by: Direct Cinema Limited
- Release date: 1991
- Country: United States
- Language: English

Death on the Job is a 1991 documentary film directed by Bill Guttentag. It was nominated for an Academy Award for Best Documentary Feature. It aired on HBO as an episode of America Undercover.

The documentary focuses on people who have died at work due to unsafe conditions and disregard of regulations by the companies. Lawyer E. Michael McCann notes that OSHA is supposed to investigate workspaces to ensure safe conditions, but many of these places had rarely or never had an OSHA investigation (and when they did, it got announced in advance when OSHA was coming, so the company would change things to give the illusion of safety and compliance).
