= Why I Hate Religion, But Love Jesus =

Song by Jefferson Bethke
- Released: January 10, 2012
- Length: 4:03
- Producer: Matthew Robertson

Music video
- "Why I Hate Religion, But Love Jesus" on YouTube

Music video
- "Why I Hate Religion, But Love Jesus" on GodTube

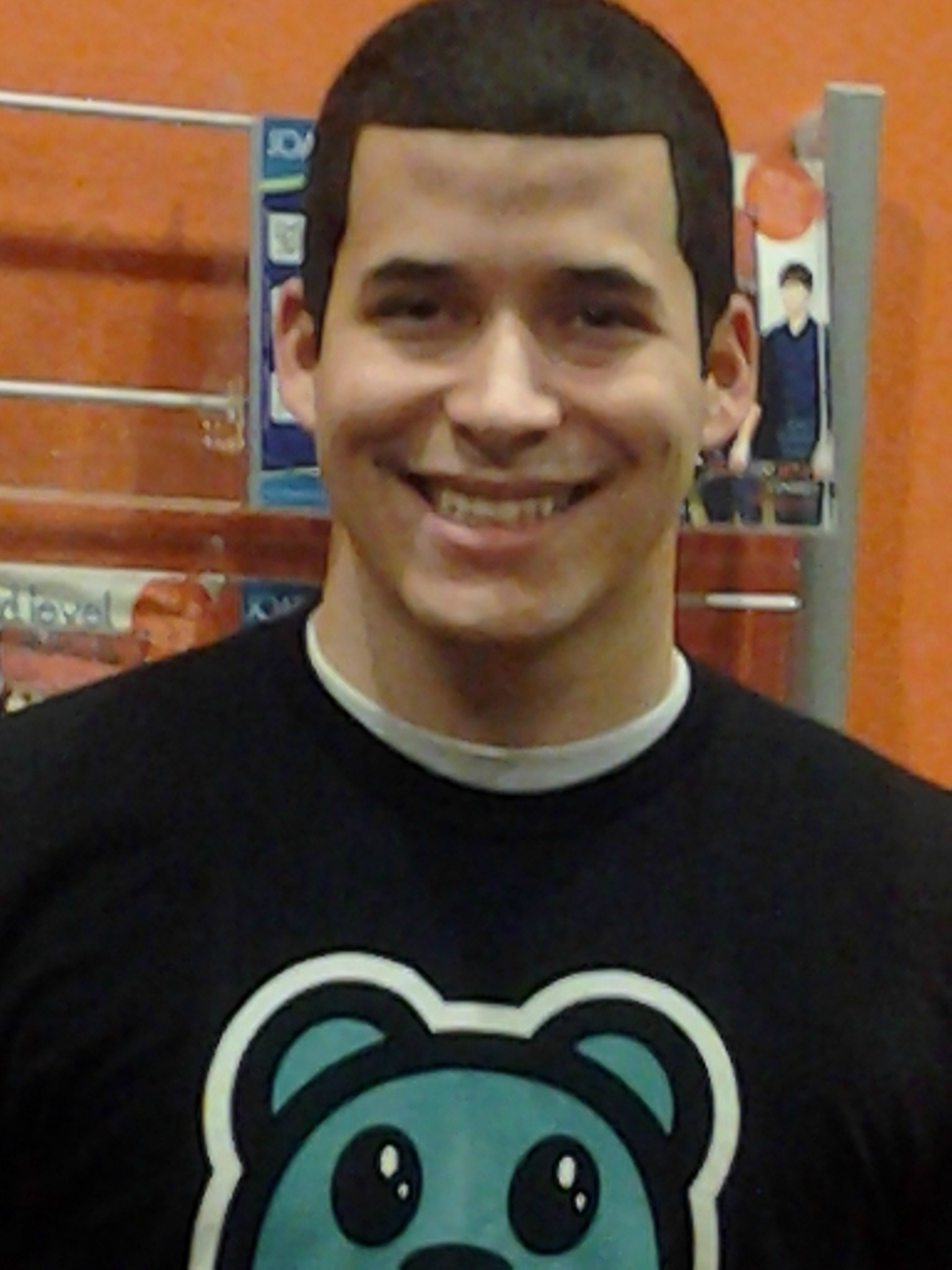
Jefferson Bethke

Why I Hate Religion, But Love Jesus is a viral video created by Christian speaker Jefferson Bethke, who uploaded his work that rose him to fame onto YouTube and GodTube, under the screenname bball1989. The video has thus far received more than 34 million views.

The theme of the video revolves around "the difference between Jesus and false religion." Underneath his video, Bethke delineated its purpose:

A poem I wrote to highlight the difference between Jesus and false religion. In the scriptures Jesus received the most opposition from the most religious people of his day. At its core Jesus' gospel and the good news of the Cross is in pure opposition to self-righteousness/self-justification. Religion is man-centered, Jesus is God-centered. This poem highlights my journey to discover this truth. Religion either ends in pride or despair. Pride because you make a list and can do it and act better than everyone, or despair because you can't do your own list of rules and feel not good enough for God. With Jesus, though, you have humble confident joy because He represents you, you don't represent yourself and His sacrifice is perfect, putting us in perfect standing with God!

Jefferson Bethke repudiated those who used his video to criticize the Church, stating "The Church is His vehicle to reach a lost world. A hospital for sinners. Saying you love Jesus but hate the Church, is like a fiancé saying he loves his future bride, but hates her kids." Nevertheless, the author of the video stated that he wanted to expose the legalism prevalent in many houses of worship. The popular rapper Lecrae, on his Facebook, encouraged his fans to think about the video by linking an article titled "Does Jesus hate religion? Kinda, sorta, not really" by Kevin DeYoung who had, since writing it, spoken with Jefferson Bethke about it and the video.

== Popularity ==
The four-minute video had received 6 million views three days after its release on January 10, 2012, as well as 64,000 comments. and by January 23, the video was viewed over 16 million times. Jefferson Bethke's videos "Sex, Marriage, & Fairytales", "Sexual Healing" and "Death Of Yolo" are his other most popular works, receiving over 6 million, 5.2 million and 1.9 million views respectively.
