= How Not to React When Your Child Tells You That He's Gay =

2014 YouTube video by Daniel Ashley Pierce

- Thumbnail of one of the re-uploaded videos
- Date: August 26, 2014
- Location: Atlanta, Georgia, USA
- Cause: Homophobia
- Filmed by: Daniel Ashley Pierce
- Participants: Daniel Ashley Pierce (victim), Pierce's stepmother, Pierce's father, Pierce's grandmother, Pierce's grandfather
- Outcome: Pierce: Relocation
- Injuries: Cheilitis

How Not to React When Your Child Tells You That He's Gay was a YouTube video filmed on 26 August 2014 which focused on a gay man from Georgia named Daniel Ashley Pierce being disowned by his Christian family due to his sexual orientation. The video was removed from YouTube due to violating YouTube's hate speech policy.

== Background ==
Daniel Ashley Pierce grew up in Kennesaw, Georgia and has two older brothers. Pierce was born with severe hearing loss and wore hearing aids since he was born. Pierce discovered he was gay between the ages of 10 and 11. Pierce (19 at time of filming) came out to his family on October 11, 2013, National Coming Out Day. Pierce initially came out to his stepmother who took the news calmly. Due to his family's disapproval of homosexuality due to their religious beliefs, Pierce's father, grandfather, stepmother, and grandmother held a religious intervention which is the incident in the video. Pierce found his family waiting for him when he returned home from work from a pet store.

== Video ==
Pierce's grandmother says "Daniel, I want to tell you before I say anything else that I love you. Now, I now you're not willing to believe that but it is true". Daniel responds, "No, I believe it." His grandmother continues, "I knew that you were gay since you were a tiny little boy." Daniel then says, "Then you would know at this point that it's not a choice." His grandmother responds by saying that he had made a choice to be gay and Daniel responded by responding, "I have not made a choice." His grandmother disagrees by saying, "You can deny it all you want to, but I believe in the word of God, and God creates nobody that way." Daniel begins to say that biological and psychological facts state that it is determined within the first six weeks of birthday what one's sexual orientation is. His grandmother says, "You can go by all the scientific stuff you want to. I'm going by the Word of God." Daniel responds by saying, "Well, scientific proof trumps the Word of God."

His grandma then says, "No, it doesn't in my opinion", "Well, in my opinion it does cause there's scientific proof that's why its called scientific proof", responds Daniel. His grandmother then begins to disown him by saying that since Pierce has "chosen that path" they will no longer support him and he needs to move out because she "will not let people believe that I condone what you do." Pierce asks his stepmother if he can stay in the basement of the house, but she refuses. “I have lot of friends of friends who are gay. But they are not family,” Pierce's stepmother says. Pierce's stepmother is heard saying, "You're full of shit. You told me on the phone that you made that choice. You know you wasn't born that way. You know damn good and well you made that choice. You know that [your father] has done everything he can to raise you. ... He didn't need to blame himself." Pierce's stepmother began punching him in the mouth, which caused a swollen lip. "You're a disgrace," a man tells him shortly before the end of the video. “No, I’m not”, Pierce replies.

== Aftermath ==
After the incident, family friends, Teri Bearden Cooper and Regina Ryan, and Pierce's boyfriend, Daniel Estrada, picked him up but was not allowed inside the home by Pierce's family. Pierce later moved in with a friend of the family. Estrada set up a GoFundMe account to help him cover living expenses, as the family cut him off financially and took his car. The video was uploaded to Reddit, specifically r/askgaybros by Estrada. In 2015, Pierce was Grand Marshal of Atlanta Pride. According to his Facebook account, Pierce married Estrada.

== Film adaptation ==
An animated film adaptation of the incident titled, Out of Exile: Daniel's Story was created by Nonny de la Peña's company, Emblematic Group and was produced by actress Sara Ramirez (Grey's Anatomy) and premiered at Sundance in 2017.
