= Hwages =

Saudi viral video

Hwages (Arabic: هواجيس, lit. 'Concerns') is a viral music video by Saudi producer Majed al-Esa of 8ies Studios published in December 2016. The video features Saudi women wearing niqabs while skateboarding and riding scooters, while the song's lyrics address women's rights in Saudi Arabia and mocks the patriarchy as well as Donald Trump. The video was viewed over 3 million times within weeks of its upload date and was shared on Twitter by Ameera al-Taweel, a prominent Saudi humanitarian figure and ex-wife of Prince Al-Waleed bin Talal. The controversial song attracted both praise and criticism within Saudi Arabia and throughout the world for its lyrics such as "May men go extinct, they cause us to have mental illnesses".

The same producer and studio had previously released the song Barbs (Arabic: بربس, lit. 'Messy') about a year earlier, which had also gone viral and had inspired many people to replicate the dance moves in the video; the Abu Dhabi Public Prosecutor issued arrest warrants for two men who uploaded a video of themselves dancing to the song while dressed in United Arab Emirates military uniforms, saying the men had danced "suggestively" and "in a manner unworthy of the uniform", representing an "affront to the honour of joining the National Service".
