= YouTube copyright strike =

Website policy action

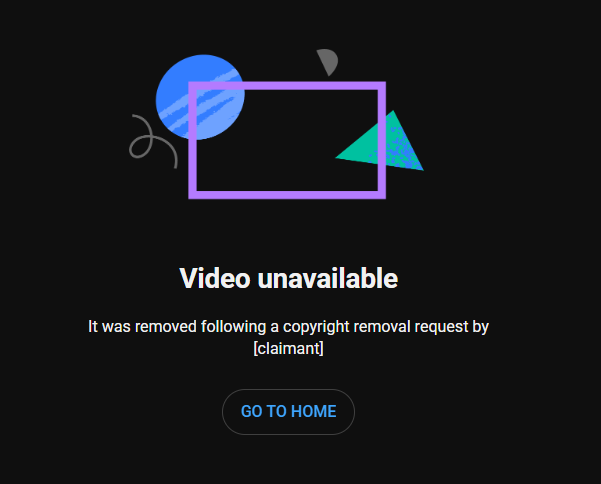
YouTube's copyright strike (request) display message.

On the American social media and online video sharing platform YouTube, a copyright strike is a copyright policing practice used by YouTube for the purpose of managing copyright infringement and complying with the Digital Millennium Copyright Act (DMCA), which is the basis for the design of the YouTube copyright strike system. For YouTube to retain DMCA safe harbor protection, it must respond to copyright infringement claims with a notice and take down process. YouTube's own practice is to issue a "YouTube copyright strike" on the user accused of copyright infringement. When a YouTube user receives a copyright strike, they are required to watch the other warning video and complete a quiz about the rules of copyright. A copyright strike will expire after 90 days. However, if a YouTube user accumulates three copyright strikes within those 90 days, YouTube terminates that user's YouTube channel, including any associated channels that the user has, removes all of their videos from that user's YouTube channel, and prohibits that user from creating another YouTube channel.

YouTube assigns strikes based on reports of copyright violations from bots.

Some users have expressed concern that the strike process is unfair to users. The complaint is that the system assumes the guilt of YouTube users and takes the side of copyright holders even when no infringement has occurred.

YouTube and game company Nintendo were criticized by Cory Doctorow, a writer for the blog Boing Boing, due to them reportedly treating video game reviewers unfairly by threatening them with strikes.

== Reasons for strikes ==
=== Disagreements about what constitutes fair use ===
Fair use is a legal rationale for reusing copyrighted content in a limited way, such as to discuss or criticize other media. Several YouTube creators have reported receiving copyright strikes for using media in the context of fair use.

=== Suppression of criticism ===
YouTube creators have reported receiving copyright strikes on videos critical of corporate products. They assert that copyright violation, in this context, has been used as a strategy to suppress criticism.

=== Strikes for posting own work ===
Copyright strikes have also been issued against creators themselves. Miracle of Sound's channel received copyright strikes as a result of automated strikes by the distributor of their own music.

=== Strikes for works in the public domain ===
In a similar incident to strikes, though in another forum, Sony Music issued an automated copyright strike against James Rhodes for a video on Facebook of him playing a part of a piece by Bach, because they owned the copyright on a similar recording, and when the strike was challenged, asserted that they owned the rights to the work, before finally admitting that Bach's compositions are in the public domain.

=== Strikes for unknown reasons ===
Some publishers on YouTube report not understanding why they have received strikes.
