= YouTube Copyright School =

- Happy Tree Friends episode
- The YouTube thumbnail, depicting Russell as he is about to get attacked by a gavel.
- Directed by: Kenn Navarro
- Original release date: March 24, 2011
- Running time: 4:39

YouTube Copyright School is a video of the adult-oriented Flash-animated web series Happy Tree Friends created for YouTube. It was uploaded by the official YouTube channel on March 24, 2011. It is created for YouTube users who infringe copyright for the first time, which results in their first "copyright strike." Afterwards, the user is sent to Copyright School, which contains "YouTube Copyright School" along with a quiz. "YouTube Copyright School" has been disliked by many YouTube users.

It was used on YouTube for 15 years. It has since been replaced by another tutorial video, Copyright School on YouTube.

== Plot ==
YouTube Copyright School begins with Russell at the movie theater, watching Lumpy and the Lumpettes – The Movie. Russell excitedly pulls out his phone and records the movie, then he uploads it to YouTube. The narrator tells Russell that he copied someone else's content. The narrator explains what copyright is and how abusing it can negatively impact a content creator (such as being sued, losing all their money, or losing their YouTube account altogether). Russell's reupload of the movie then gets taken down by Lumpy, resulting in Russell's first copyright strike, then Russell receives the email informing him of his actions. The narrator talks about how a YouTuber can get a copyright strike and that accumulating three strikes will ban the user for life. Afterwards, he asks Russell to try and make an original video.

Russell sees Lumpy, Petunia and Giggles singing the theme song of the movie at a live performance. Russell tries to record it, but is told by the narrator that even a live performance is still protected by copyright. He uploads a video called 'Russell's Remix', which is Russell's remix of Lumpy's song. Russell does not know if it is fair use or not, then a 'Fair Use' card appears explaining what fair use is. Then Russell tries to push the card quickly, but ends up being crushed. Lumpy discovers Russell's video, and he angrily takes it down, resulting in Russell's second strike. Russell tries to send a false counter-notification, but the narrator explains that users might end up in court if they misuse the counter-notification process. Afterwards, Russell turns off the computer and finally decides to make an original video.

The video ends with Russell in a cannon on a pirate ship singing his original song, but the cannon explodes and sends him through the floor, making the ship sink. Russell then gets attacked by piranhas and the last scene shown is Russell's injuries from the piranha bites.

== Release and reception ==
YouTube Copyright School was uploaded by the official YouTube channel on March 24, 2011. YouTube users who got a "copyright strike" for the first time, the user is sent to Copyright School, which contains "YouTube Copyright School" along with a quiz where they need to answer a few questions.

YouTube Copyright School was disliked by many YouTube users since it was a non-violent video containing characters from Happy Tree Friends, which is known for its graphic violence.

== Copyright School on YouTube ==
A tutorial video Copyright School on YouTube, part of the YouTube Creators channel, was released in December 2025. On June 3, 2026, this tutorial video officially replaced YouTube Copyright School.
