= Bus monitor bullying video =

Viral video depicting bullying

Making The Bus Monitor Cry
- Thumbnail of the YouTube video
- Date: June 18, 2012
- Location: School Bus #784 – Greece, NY, USA
- Also known as: Bus monitor bullying video
- Cause: Bullying
- Participants: Karen Klein (bus monitor/victim), 4 male students (perpetrators)
- Outcome: Students: 1 year school suspension + 50 hours community service Bus Monitor: retirement

"Making The Bus Monitor Cry" is one of three videos filmed in June 2012 which focused on a bus monitor, who was targeted for bullying by four seventh graders attending Greece Athena Middle School. The video went viral and received numerous video responses and news coverage. A donation campaign titled, “Let’s Give Karen The Bus Monitor a Vacation,” was launched for the victim.

== Background ==
The bus monitor, Karen Huff Klein (68 at the time of the filming) was an employee of the Greece Central School District in Upstate New York. After serving 20 years as a bus driver, Klein had been a bus monitor for 3 years.

Klein, at the time of the incident, had been a widow since 1995 and had eight grandchildren; she was partly deaf and used a hearing aid.

== Video of the incident ==
The video was originally recorded by one of the students in the bus who has always been kind to her. It was then uploaded on Facebook. Later, a YouTube user reposted the video onto YouTube on the day after; June 19, 2012, with the title "Making The Bus Monitor Cry", alongside two other videos with the titles "Bus Monitor Harassment", and "Bus Monitor Harassment 2". Within a few days, it had been watched by millions of viewers.

The Bus Monitor Harassment video series is filmed primarily in the back of Bus #784, lightly focused on Klein. In these videos, one of the children becomes angry from being disciplined and says "Karen, you're fat". The third video, "Making The Bus Monitor Cry" is directly targeting Klein. It was organized by three of the four boys, and the fourth student later stated that he had been asked to film the bullying by means of peer pressure.

In the video, the 7th grade boys are heard bullying Klein with taunts that include her appearance, age,and comment about "the water on her face", at first saying it was sweat. Once she explains she is crying, they reply that the reason is that she misses her box of Twinkies. They then proceed with remarks about Twinkies, call her a "fat-ass" constantly, touch her, and demand that she provide her address on camera. They also threaten to egg her house, to urinate on her door, to ejaculate in her mouth, and to stab her.

One boy refers to Klein's family, saying, "They all killed themselves, because they didn't want to be near you." In reality, Klein’s oldest son had committed suicide in 2002, ten years before the video was uploaded. It was not known if the boy who made the comment was aware of this. Klein attempted to ignore them, and forced herself not to retaliate. She instead remarked a few times such as "I know all of your addresses! I'm going to send you all thank-you cards, for being so nice."

Klein said she had been bullied by the boys before, and that, they are generally mean to her. One time, she had her hearing aid knocked out. But that day, things went up to a whole another level. When asked by the media if the bullies were just being jerks or if they were actually rotten apples, Klein responded, "Two are jerks, and two are rotten apples." Despite being bullied, Klein didn’t want to see any criminal charges filed against the four kids. She would rather they do some community work, but she didn’t believe that their actions were worthy of putting them behind the bars. She also didn’t like that the kids’ families were receiving threats from people.

== Reactions ==
After the bullies' identities were revealed, they received many death threats. The video prompted an investigation on the part of school officials and local police. Klein stated that she would not press charges against the students, partly because of the flood of death threats and criticism aimed at them. She also stated she would like an apology and a different bus route. When an apology was issued, however, she rejected it as insufficient.

On June 29, 2012, the Greece Central School District announced that the boys would be suspended from the middle school for one full academic year, and each boy would also be required to complete 50 hours of community service with senior citizens and complete a formal program in bullying prevention.

On his show Anderson Cooper 360°, CNN anchor Anderson Cooper announced that Southwest Airlines offered to pay for a trip for Klein and nine people of her choice to Walt Disney World for a three-night visit. Klein responded, "It does make me feel a whole lot better. I appreciated everything. I think it's awesome."

Soon after the video went viral, Max Sidorov, a Ukrainian immigrant living in Toronto who says he had been a victim of bullying as a child, started a campaign titled, “Let’s Give Karen The Bus Monitor a Vacation” at fundraising site Indiegogo with a goal of $5,000, to help give Klein a vacation and posted it to Reddit. Within a few days of its creation, the fund had surpassed half a million dollars, and by June 25, over $650,000. An Indiegogo spokesperson stated that the website was in touch with Klein, who would receive the money raised by the scheduled end of the fundraiser on July 20, 2012. When the campaign ended on July 20, Klein's campaign had received a total of $703,833. Klein stated that she planned to use $100,000 of the earnings to establish the Karen Klein Anti-Bullying Foundation, as part of the GiveBack Foundation.

On July 27, 2012, Klein announced that she planned to retire as a bus monitor, calling it "a tough decision".

== Aftermath ==
In March 2015, two of the four students who appeared in the video with Klein were accused of bullying a special-needs classmate with several other students in a bathroom in the local high school, forcing him to hold his crotch and consume urine out of a toilet. When interviewed about the incident, Karen Klein told WHEC, "I don't believe this is happening again".
