= Zenga Zenga =

Single by Noy Alooshe
- Released: March 6, 2011
- Length: 2:10

Zenga Zenga is an auto-tuned song and viral YouTube video that parodied the Libyan leader Muammar Gaddafi. The song, released on February 22, 2011, quickly became popular among the Libyan opposition active in the 2011 Libyan civil war.

The song was created by Noy Alooshe, an Israeli journalist and musician. The original video has more than 6 million views and the edited "clean" version has surpassed 1 million hits.

== Background ==
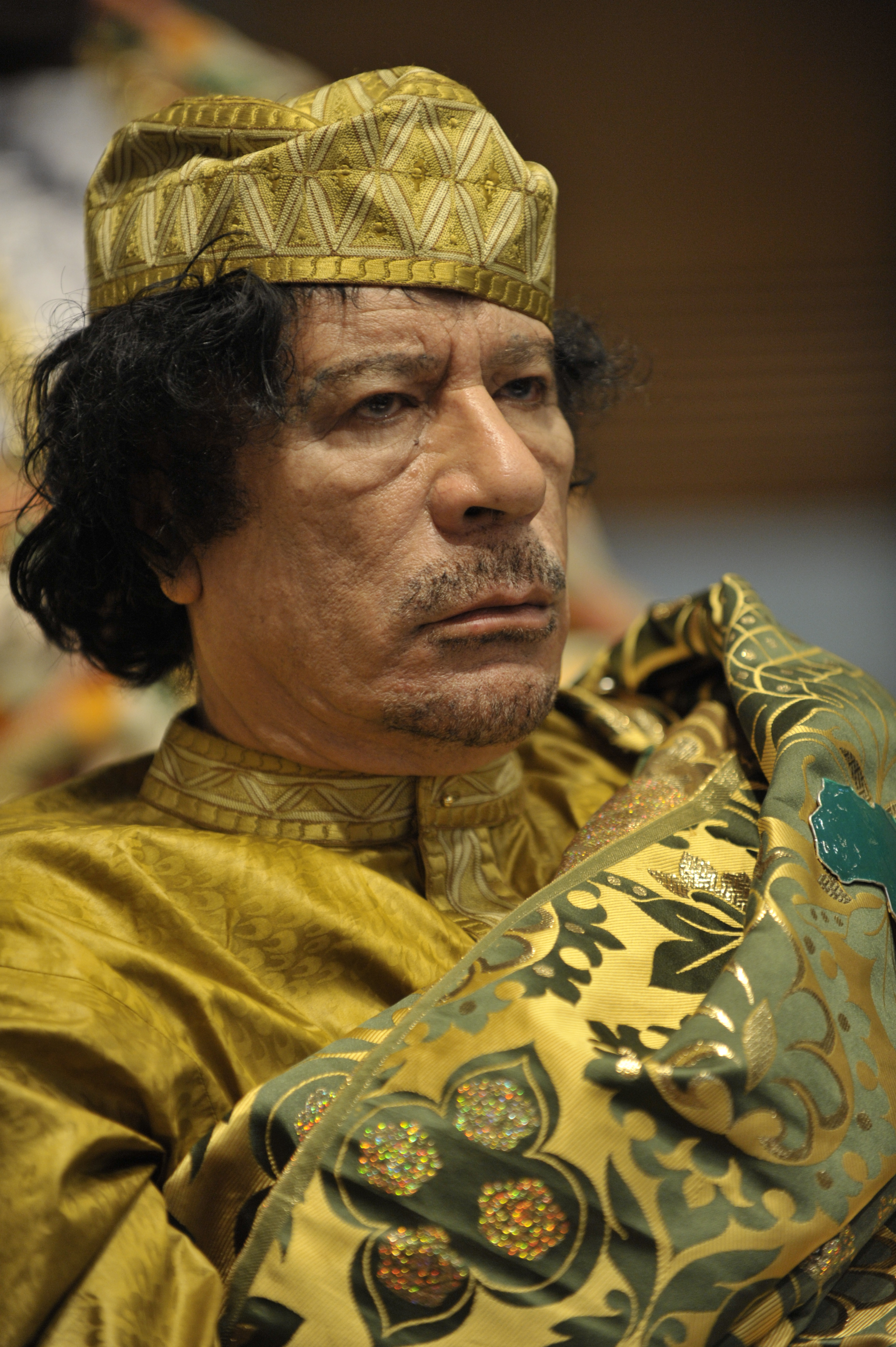
Former Libyan ruler Muammar Gaddafi

On February 22, 2011, Gaddafi gave a televised speech amidst violent social unrest against his government. In the speech (in Arabic), Gaddafi vowed to hunt down protesters "inch by inch, house by house, home by home, alleyway by alleyway [Arabic: زنقة زنقة pronounced in Libyan dialect as Zenga Zenga]."

An Israeli journalist and musician, Noy Alooshe, was watching the speech and saw Gaddafi's strange dress and gesticulations as something out of a trance party. Gaddafi would often be seen giving speeches surrounded by his "Revolutionary Nuns." Using the natural beat of Gaddafi's words, Alooshe spent a few hours at his computer and using Auto-Tune technology set the speech to the music of "Hey Baby," a song by American rapper Pitbull featuring another American rap artist, T-Pain. The original video features clips from Gaddafi's speech alongside mirror images of a scantily clad woman dancing.

Alooshe titled the new song "Zenga Zenga," based on Gaddafi's repetition in his speech of the word zanqa, Arabic for alleyway in the Libyan dialect. American comedian Conan O'Brien ostensibly first popularized the transformation of zanqa into "zenga zenga" and Alooshe named the clip accordingly. By early Wednesday morning in Israel, Alooshe had uploaded the "electro hip hop remix" to YouTube. By Sunday night, through promotion on Twitter and Facebook, the video had gone viral, receiving nearly 500,000 hits.

== Reception ==
Reactions were largely positive, according to The New York Times. Some also found the video distasteful, not only because it contains a woman provocatively dancing, but also because the creator of the video, Alooshe, is an Israeli Jew. At the request of web users who wanted to be able to share the video with their more conservative parents, Alooshe created another version without the clips of the dancer.

However, Gaddafi and his loyalist supporters apparently co-opted the song for their own purposes. As reported by The Guardian, at a speech given by Gaddafi's daughter, Ayesha Gaddafi, "Zenga Zenga" blared in the background.

The original video has more than 6 million views on YouTube. The edited version without the girl has over 1 million hits.
