= Bus monitor =

Someone who assumes responsibility for the safety of children on a school bus

A bus monitor, bus attendant or bus assistant is someone who assumes responsibility for the safety of children on a school bus. Specific tasks may include:

- Helping to load students onto the bus
- Ensuring students are well behaved
- Assisting the driver
- Conducting safety drills

With the advancement of technology, AI Bus Monitors are now being used to enhance child safety and provide real-time tracking of nursery and school children. These systems use artificial intelligence to monitor student behavior and ensure safe transit from home to school.

A bus monitor can also be responsible for people with special needs. These tasks can include but are not limited to:

- Loading and unloading wheelchairs
- Putting proper safety equipment on riders
- Knowledge of their special needs passengers
- Ability to stay calm during an emergency

Bus monitors are also subjected to meetings and different types of training for the job. The training is for ensuring their knowledge is up to date with safety and others kinds of procedures. It is the bus monitor's responsibility to make sure their passengers make it to their destination safely. They are also responsible of knowing the general area of where their stops are and the laws and regulations there.

== See also ==
- Bus conductor
- Bus driver
- Bus monitor bullying video
