= Noy Alooshe =

Israeli journalist and musician (born 1979)

Noy Alooshe נוי אלוש
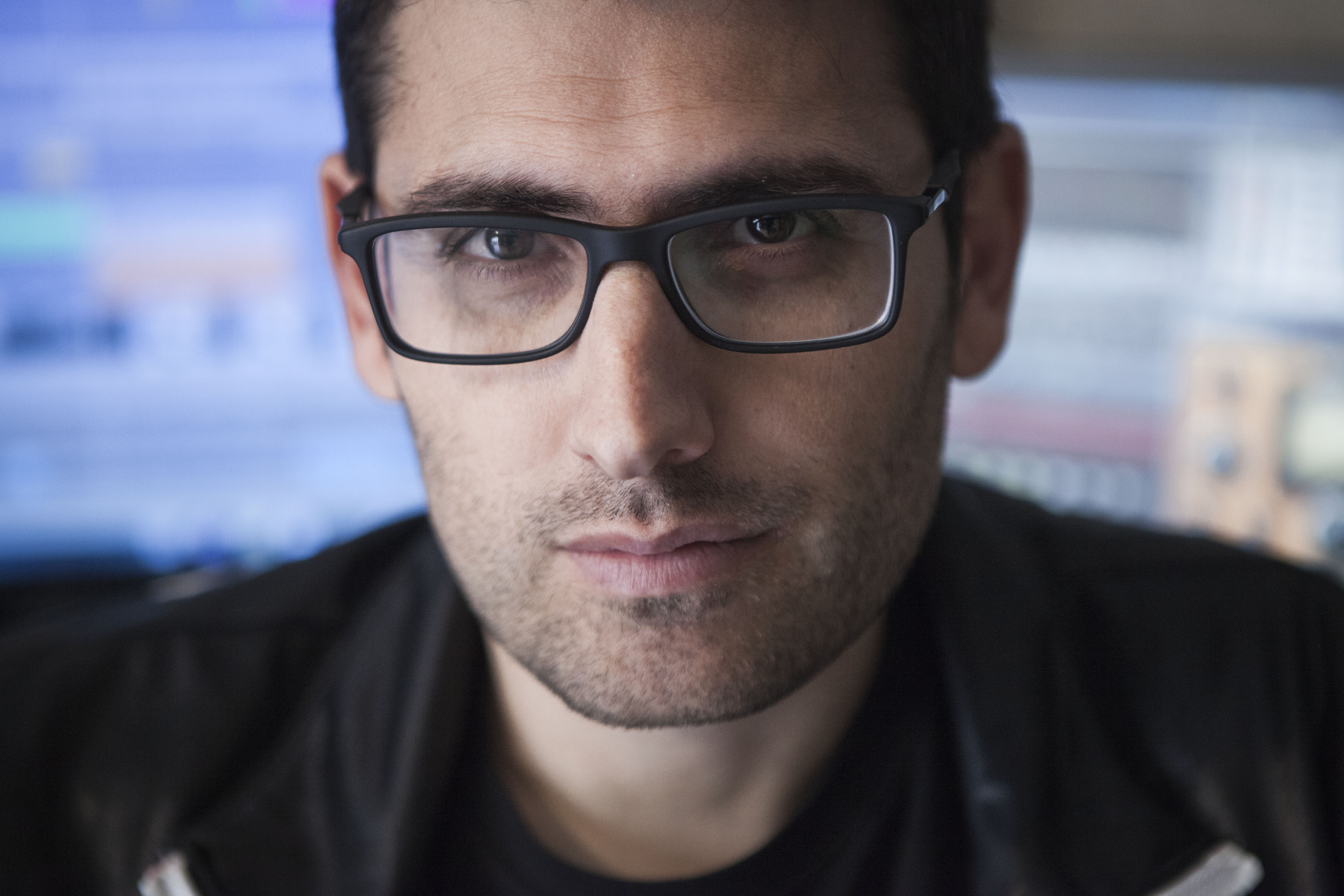

Background information
- Born: 13 August 1979 (age 47)
- Origin: Tel Aviv, Israel
- Genres: Hip hop, electronic dance
- Occupations: Musician, journalist

Noy Alooshe (Hebrew: נוי אלוש; born 13 August 1979) is an Israeli journalist and musician.

== Biography ==
His family is of Tunisian-Jewish descent. He is best known outside Israel for his "Zenga Zenga" spoof song, satirizing Muammar Gaddafi. He lives in Tel Aviv and is a member of the Israeli techno group Hovevei Zion ("Lovers of Zion"), best known for its hit song "Rotze Banot" ("I Want Girls"), a Hebrew remix of the Swedish dance song "Boten Anna."

Alooshe shared that he received many commercial offers as a result of the success of "Zenga Zenga": "These days are crazy because advertisers are calling me and wanting me to do productions for them; music companies want to sell the song on iTunes." In 2011, he said he had also received antisemitic death threats, though he was not too concerned since "at the moment they remain on the Internet."

Apart from "Zenga Zenga", his by far best known work, he also spoofed Benjamin Netanyahu's speech to the United States Congress to the tune of "We No Speak Americano" as "Bi Bi pro Americano". He also wrote Dvir Bar's song "Livni Boy," one of Israel's first political YouTube hits. Alooshe worked for Tzipi Livni's Hatnuah campaign in 2013.
