= List of notable YouTube videos of the 2000s =

YouTube logo from 2005–2011

This is a list of YouTube videos from the 2000s that journalists, online newspapers, or magazines have written about. The videos on this list are recognized primarily for their YouTube upload and were included in many separate articles from different publications (inclusive of all time periods), as chosen by their editorial staff.

== 2005 ==
=== Me at the zoo ===
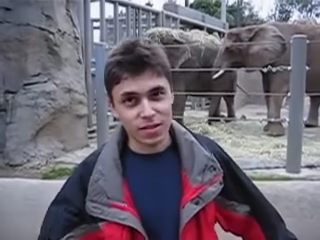
Screenshot from Me at the zoo

Me at the zoo is recognized as the first video uploaded to the platform. The 19-second video features Jawed Karim, one of the co-founders of YouTube, being recorded by his high school friend, Yakov Lapitsky. In the video, Karim is seen standing in front of two elephants at the San Diego Zoo in California, where he briefly comments on the length of their trunks. Multiple publications agreed that the video embodies YouTube as a whole and stated it was a milestone of the platform's history. Karim has later updated the video's description several times. (Note: Me at the zoo:)

=== Pokemon Theme Music Video ===
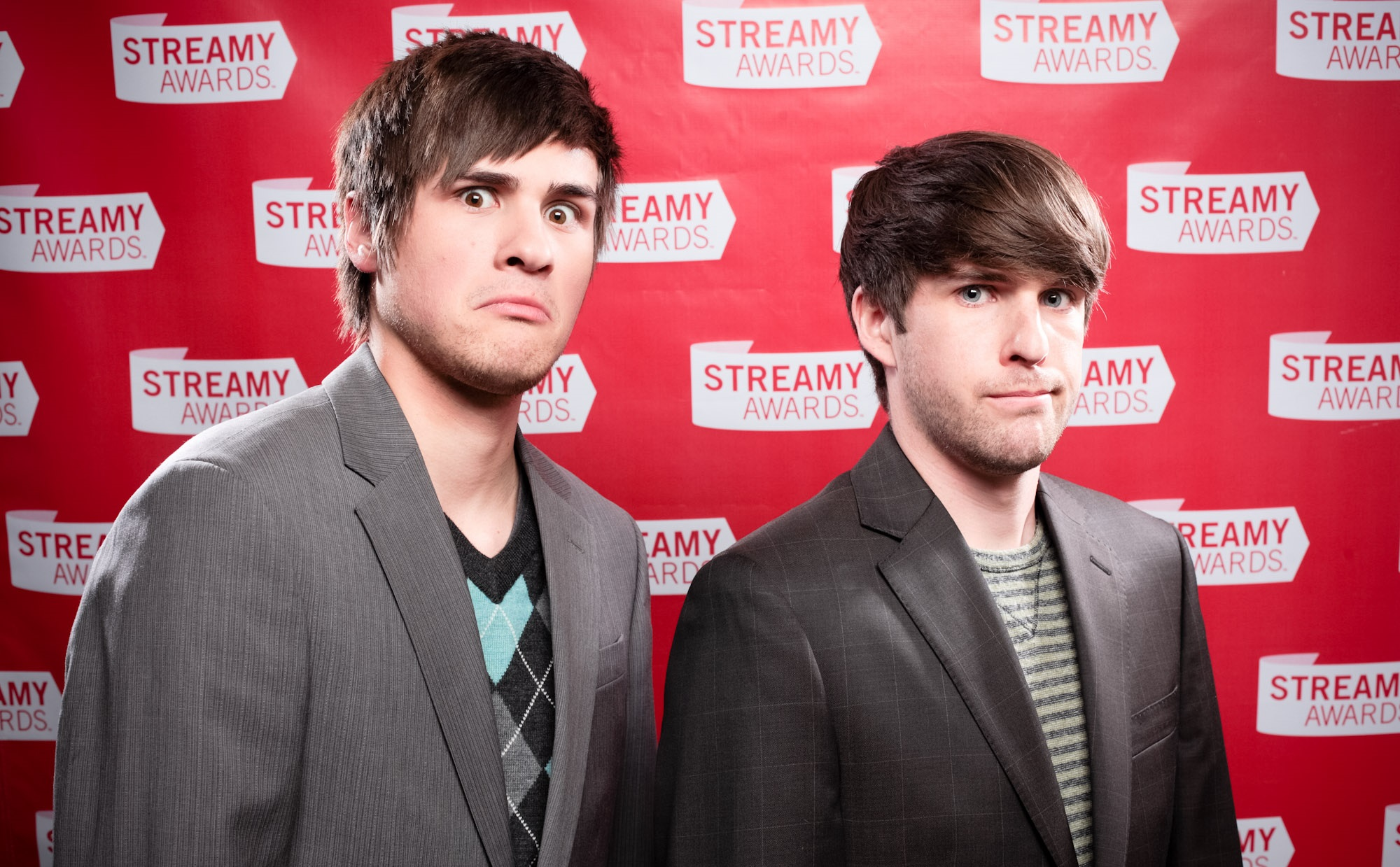
Anthony Padilla and Ian Hecox from Pokemon Theme Music Video

Pokemon Theme Music Video was released on November 28, 2005 by the channel Smosh. It followed the same style as their other earlier videos, featuring the duo lip-syncing the original English theme song for the Pokémon anime. The video instantly became much more popular than any of their other videos. Over the course of its lifetime, it gained over 24 million views, and briefly became the most-viewed video on all of YouTube. The video was later removed from the site in 2007 due to a copyright infringement claim. Due to the channel's continued success, and Smosh's partnership with YouTube, the two recreated the video in November 2010, this time changing the words to be critical of The Pokémon Company taking down the Pokémon theme video. (Note: Pokemon Theme Music Video (viral video):)

=== Lazy Sunday ===
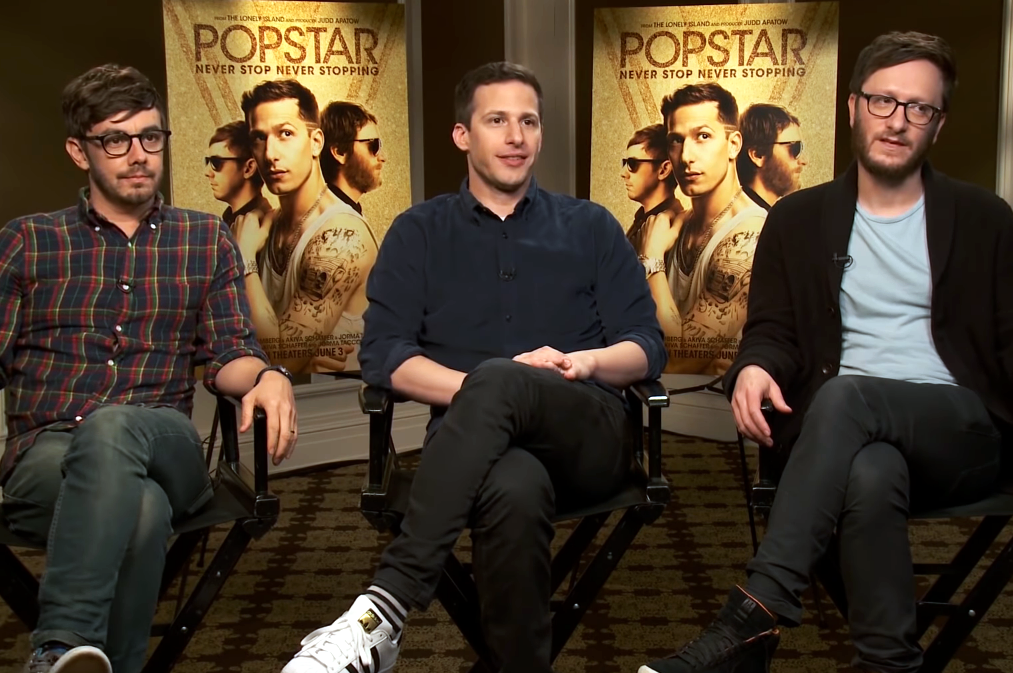
From left to right: Jorma Taccone, Andy Samberg and Akiva Schaffer, the creators of Lazy Sunday

Lazy Sunday is a single and short film by American comedy troupe The Lonely Island. Some time in 2005 to 2006, multiple unofficial uploads of the video went viral and were cumulatively watched more than five million times on YouTube. YouTube at that time was a startup website that appeared to be aimed for video creators, but by February 2006, due to "Lazy Sunday", established itself as a home for any type of video sharing. In August 2013, the official Saturday Night Live YouTube channel uploaded "Lazy Sunday". (Note: Lazy Sunday (The Lonely Island song):)

=== Where the Hell is Matt? 2005 ===
Where the Hell is Matt? is video that features Matt Harding of Dancing doing a dance "jig" in many different places around the world. The video garnered popularity on the video sharing site YouTube. There are now five major videos plus two outtakes and several background videos on YouTube. Matt dances alone in the first videos. In 2008 others join with him doing the dance "jig"; in 2010 he does the Diski Dance in South Africa. In 2012 he works with other dancers, sometimes using a local dance or another dance step. In 2007, Jawed Karim, one of the founders of YouTube, stated that Harding's video was his favorite on YouTube at that time. (Note: Where the Hell is Matt?:)

== 2006 ==
=== Al Gore's Penguin Army ===
Al Gore's Penguin Army is a two-minute-long satirical webvideo posted on YouTube on May 24, 2006, spoofing Al Gore and his movie An Inconvenient Truth. There is evidence that the video is a product of the dishonest marketing technique of astroturfing. The Wall Street Journal consulted a professor of communications who described the spoof as "'Propaganda 101' and said: "It contains no factual information, but presents a highly negative image [of Al Gore]." (Note: Al Gore's Penguin Army:)

=== Bus Uncle ===
The Bus Uncle (X尚義聲線高壓呀叔搭巴士途中問候後生仔) is a Hong Kong Cantonese viral video depicting a verbal altercation between two men aboard a KMB bus in Hong Kong on 27 April 2006. The older and more belligerent of the two men was quickly nicknamed the "Bus Uncle", from the common Hong Kong practice of referring to older men as "Uncle" (阿叔). (Note: The Bus Uncle:)

=== Charlie the Unicorn ===
Charlie the Unicorn is a 2005 animated comedy short film created by Jason Steele of independent film company FilmCow in Orlando, Florida. Charlie the Unicorn has become increasingly popular since its inception. Following its posting on Newgrounds in 2005, Geoff Swanson of YouTube posted a copy of the video on the website in 2006, where it rapidly gained popularity. (Note: Charlie the Unicorn)

=== La Caída de Edgar ===
La Caída de Edgar (Edgar's Fall) is a 2006 video of Mexican boys Edgar Martinez and Fernando, hiking in a ranch near their home town of Monterrey. It starts with Edgar using a makeshift bridge that crosses a small stream when Fernando makes a joke about pushing Edgar off the bridge into the water. Edgar finally loses his balance, plunging into the stream. Edgar curses more intensively as he emerges from the water, while Fernando asks for forgiveness. (Note: Edgar's Fall:)

=== lonelygirl15 ===
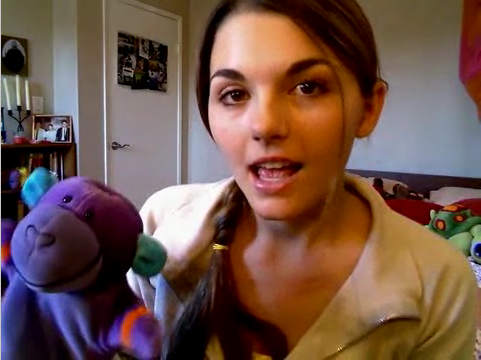
Screenshot from Lonelygirl15

lonelygirl15 is an American science fiction thriller web series created by Miles Beckett, Mesh Flinders, Greg Goodfried, and Amanda Goodfried. It was independently released on YouTube from June 16, 2006, to August 1, 2008, and was also briefly released on Revver and Myspace. The series revolves around the initially mundane life of homeschooled 16-year-old Bree Avery played by Jessica Lee Rose (pictured), who uses the username Lonelygirl15 online. (Note: lonelygirl15:)

=== Noah takes a photo of himself every day for 6 years. ===
Noah takes a photo of himself every day for 6 years (or Everyday) is an ongoing art project by American photographer Noah Kalina that gained widespread attention when the first segment of the project was released in 2006 and became a viral video. The first everyday video features a fast montage of thousands of pictures of Kalina spanning a period of six years all played sequentially as a time lapse. (Note: Everyday (video):)

=== Evolution of Dance ===
Judson Laipply from Evolution of Dance

Evolution of Dance is a performance by Judson Laipply and uploaded by Ireneusz Krosny, the video consisted of 12 popular dance songs of the late 20th century. In the video which was later uploaded to YouTube on April 6, 2006, he is seen performing various dance moves on stage with a spot light pointing at him in under 8 minutes. (Note: Evolution of Dance:)

=== Free Hugs Campaign - Official Page (music by Sick Puppies) ===
Free Hugs Campaign - Official Page (music by Sick Puppies) is a 2006 video that started the "Free Hugs Campaign". The campaign became famous internationally in September 2006 as the result of a music video on YouTube for the song "All The Same" by Australian band Sick Puppies, which has been viewed over 79 million times as of March 2026. (Note: Free Hugs Campaign:)

=== OK Go - Here It Goes Again (Official Music Video) ===
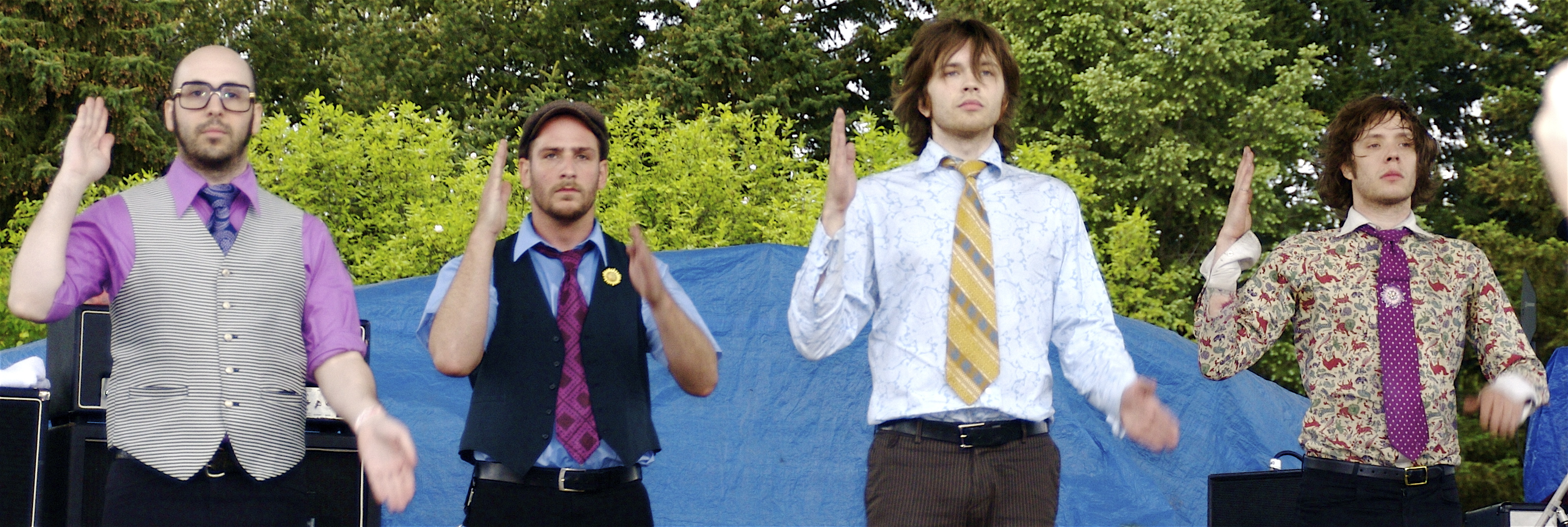
OK Go band members from Here It Goes Again

Here It Goes Again is a 2006 song by American rock band OK Go. The music video of this song is a performance of the band dancing on eight treadmills, arranged in two rows of four and in alternating opposite directions, in a single continuous take. It was choreographed and co-directed by the band and lead singer Damian Kulash's sister Trish Sie and filmed at her home in Orlando, Florida. It took two to three days of practice and then 17 attempts to complete the video. The band's webmaster suggested they upload the video to YouTube, which at the time was just beginning to take off as a video sharing site. It release on YouTube on July 31, 2006, and has been viewed over 69 million times as of January 2026. Here It Goes Again won the 2007 Grammy Award for Best Short Form Music Video and the 2006 YouTube awards for Most Creative Video. (Note: Here It Goes Again (music video):)

=== Its Over 9000!!! [Original Video and Audio] ===
It's Over 9000!!! is an Internet meme that became popular in 2006, involving a change made for English localizations of an episode of the Dragon Ball Z anime television series titled "The Return of Goku", which originally aired in the United States on April 19, 1997. The popularity of the meme quickly spread, inspiring a series of remix videos on YouTube. The most viewed video clip uploaded on YouTube which references the phrase has received over 15 million views to date; various parodies and spoofs of the clip receive a large number of views on YouTube as well. (Note: It's Over 9000!:)

=== Kiwi! ===
Kiwi! is a 2006 computer-generated animation short film created by Dony Permedi as his Master's Thesis project at the School of Visual Arts in New York City. The music was composed and performed by Tim Cassell. The short gained widespread popularity online after being uploaded to YouTube. the animation has been viewed over 49 million times. It won official recognition on March 26, 2007, when viewers voted it the Most Adorable video of 2006 in the first annual YouTube Video Awards. (Note: Kiwi!:)

=== Lo que tú Quieras Oír ===
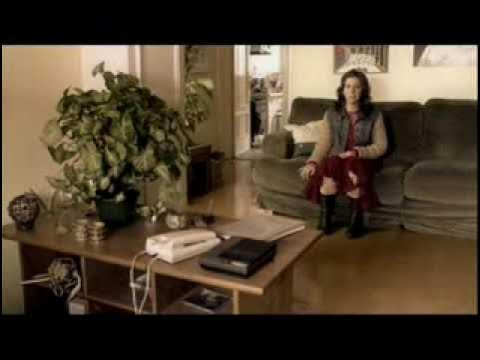
Thumbnail for Lo que tú Quieras Oír

Lo que tú quieras oír (Whatever You Want To Hear) is a Spanish language short drama by Guillermo Zapata added to YouTube on March 26, 2006. For a time, the video was the most-watched non-English video on YouTube, the third most-viewed video excluding music videos, and the twelfth most viewed of all time, with over 100 million views. (Note: Lo que tú quieras oír:)

=== Loosechange2 ===
Loose Change is a series of seven films released between 2005 and 2017 that argue in favor of certain conspiracy theories relating to the September 11 attacks. The films were written and directed by Dylan Avery and produced by Korey Rowe, Jason Bermas, and Matthew Brown. Vanity Fair to say it could be the first Internet blockbuster. In April 2005, the first edition of Loose Change was made available for free on the Internet and was given a limited DVD release with 50,000 sold and 100,000 given away. The second edition of Loose Change was uploaded to YouTube under the title "Loosechange2". (Note: Loose Change:)

=== Male Restroom Etiquette ===
Male Restroom Etiquette is a 2006 American short subject created by Phil R. Rice and produced by his company Zarathustra Studios. The film is a mockumentary about unwritten rules of behavior in male restrooms and is intended to be a parody of educational and social guidance films. the film became popular on YouTube, where, after being featured on the front page in early October 2006. (Note: Male Restroom Etiquette:)

=== myspace: the movie (Official) ===
myspace: the movie is a 2006 short film and viral video created by David Lehre. Its name refers to Myspace, the social networking website, which it parodies. Two years later, a new video by Lehre was released, but instead of Myspace, focused on Facebook. More than 10 copies of the movie were produced on YouTube. Reaction has extended beyond the social networking sites and into the mainstream media including mentions in The Boston Globe, San Francisco Chronicle, and The New York Times. The worldwide attention that the video received earned the video's creator, David Lehre, the opportunity to develop a pilot for Fox Television. (Note: The MySpace Movie:)

=== Numa Numa ===
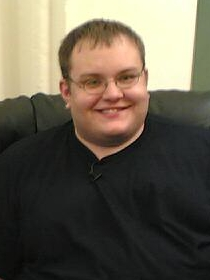
Gary Brolsma from Numa Numa

Numa Numa is an Internet meme based on a video by American vlogger Gary Brolsma made after the song "Dragostea din Tei", released by Moldovan pop group O-Zone in 2003. Brolsma's video, entitled Numa Numa Dance, was uploaded to the website Newgrounds on December 6, 2004. (Note: Numa Numa (video):)

=== Shoes the Full Version ===
Shoes the Full Version is a song recorded by American actor Liam Kyle Sullivan, performing as his alter ego, Kelly. After Sullivan posted its music video to his own website in early 2006, he uploaded it to YouTube on May 5, 2006, where it became one of the first-ever viral videos online. It has appeared on several lists of the best YouTube videos of all time and has been described as an important moment in the history of YouTube and of the Internet due to its virality. (Note: Shoes (Kelly song):)

=== Techno Viking ===
Techno Viking is an internet phenomenon and meme based on a video from the 2000 Fuckparade in Berlin, Germany. In 2006 an unknown user re-published it to YouTube, and it went viral in 2007. According to Fritsch, its popularity began on a Central American pornography site. By mid-2010, the video had generated over 20 million hits on YouTube alone; as of January 2013, the original version had more than 16 million views. (Note: Techno Viking:)

=== The WTF Blanket (Snuggie Parody) ===
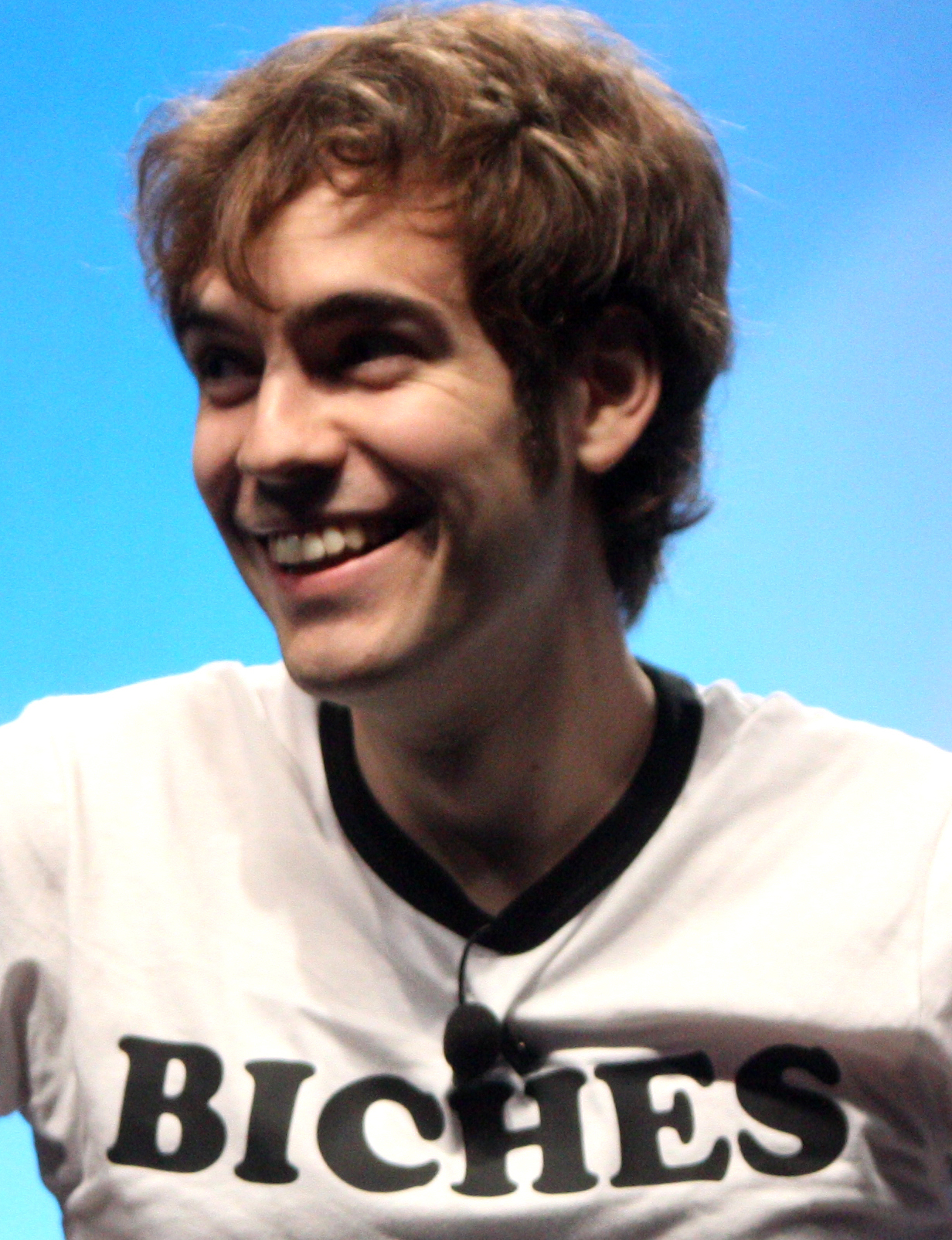
jacksfilms from The WTF Blanket (Snuggie Parody)

The WTF Blanket (Snuggie Parody) is a video by American YouTuber jacksfilms. He uploaded it on January 22, 2009, and it remains his most-viewed video as of February 2025, amassing over 25.9 million views. The video was praised by many news outlet at the time of its release. (Note: The WTF Blanket (Snuggie Parody):)

== 2007 ==
=== IPHONE BILL ===
iPhone bill is a video where YouTube personality Justine Ezarik better known as iJustine, gets a 300-page iPhone bill from AT&T Mobility mailed in a box, which became an Internet meme in August 2007. Total views were reported to exceed 8 million by the end of 2007. Ezarik said she earned $2,000 from the video from Revver. (Note: 300-page iPhone bill:)

=== Battle at Kruger ===
Battle at Kruger is an eight-minute amateur wildlife video that depicts a confrontation between a herd of Cape buffalo, a small group of young lions from a pride, and two crocodiles. Since being posted on YouTube on 3 May 2007, Battle at Kruger has received over 90 million views as of 2023 and has become a viral video sensation. It was widely praised for its dramatic depiction of wildlife on the African savannah. (Note: Battle at Kruger:)

=== Bride has massive Hair Wig Out ===
Bride Has Massive Hair Wig Out is the name of a viral video uploaded to YouTube in early 2007. The campaign was created by Canadian Advertising Agency, Capital C. Seemingly shot by one of three bridesmaids, it shows a bride (Canadian actress Jodi Behan) so unhappy with her hairstyle on her wedding day that she starts cutting it off. (Note: Bride Has Massive Hair Wig Out:)

=== Charlie bit my finger - again ! ===
Charlie Bit My Finger is a 2007 Internet viral video famous for being at the time the most viewed YouTube video. featuring Harry Davies-Carr (aged 3) and Charlie Davies-Carr (aged 1), two brothers from England. Both seated in a chair, Charlie nibbles on Harry's finger, to the amusement of both. Harry says "Charlie bit me" As of October 2022, the video received over 897 million views. It became the second most viewed video in August 2009, and took over the title as the most viewed video ever at the end of October 2009, when it surpassed "Evolution of Dance". By November 2009, "Charlie Bit My Finger – Again!" had received over 130 million views. (Note: Charlie Bit My Finger:)

=== "Chocolate Rain" Original Song by Tay Zonday ===
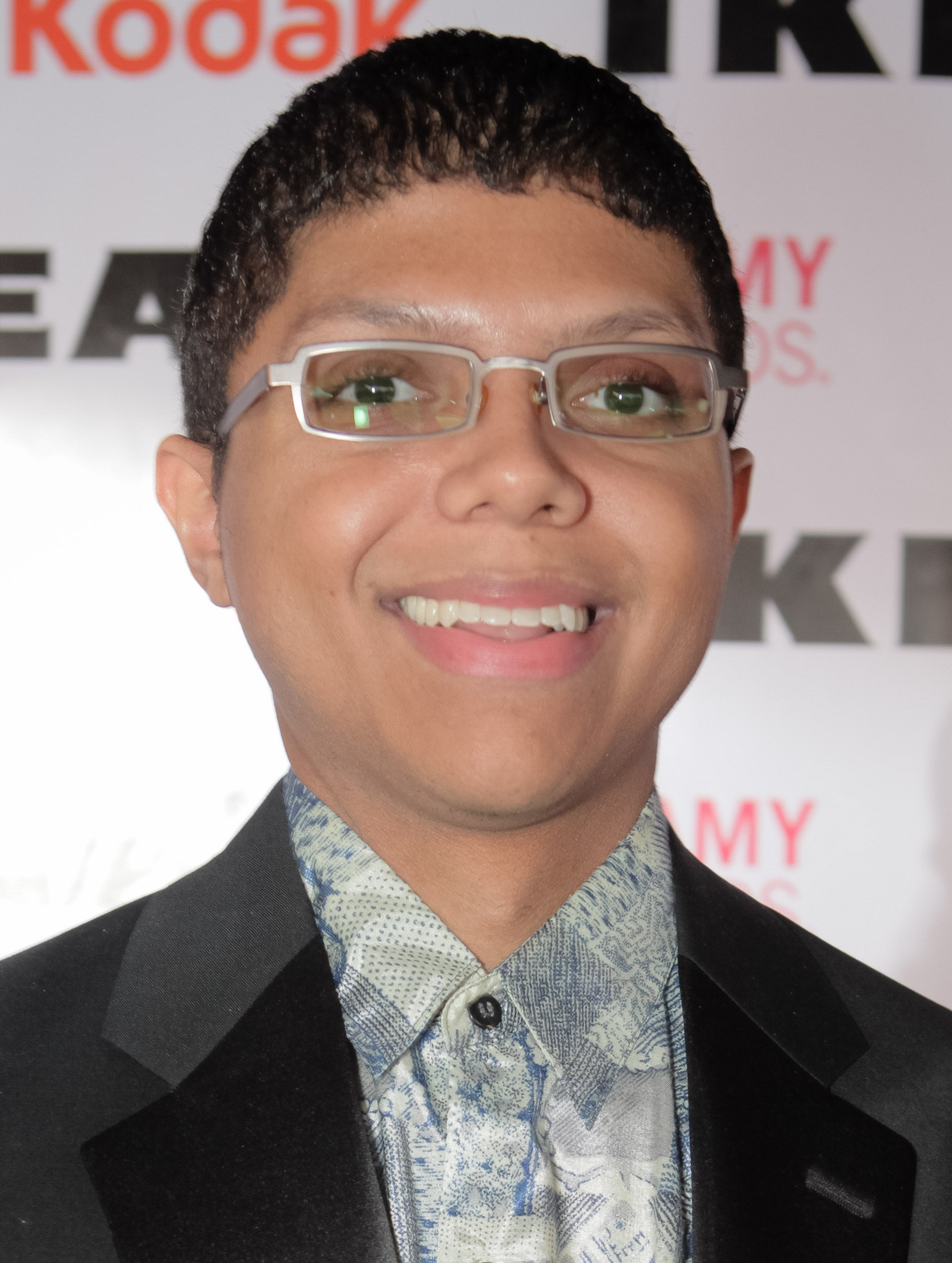
Tay Zonday from Chocolate Rain

Chocolate Rain is a song by American singer Tay Zonday. It quickly became popular after the music video for the song was uploaded to YouTube on April 22, 2007, and has since been viewed more than 140 million times as of May 2025. From time to time, Zonday moves away from the microphone in between lines; an explanation is provided via a caption that appears early in the video – "**I move away from the mic to breathe in". (Note: Chocolate Rain:)

=== Crush on Obama ===
Crush on Obama is an Internet viral video, first posted on YouTube in June 2007 featuring a young woman seductively singing of her love for then-U.S. Senator (later President) Barack Obama. On June 13, 2007, the video was posted to the video sharing website YouTube and garnered over one thousand views within the first five hours of its posting. By the second day the American news media had taken notice of the video's growing popularity. Relles, Ettinger and Kauffman appeared on many television news programs. (Note: Crush on Obama:)

=== Daft Hands - Harder, Better, Faster, Stronger ===
Daft Hands is a 2007 YouTube viral video which shows a pair of hands moving to reveal each word of the Daft Punk song Harder, Better, Faster, Stronger lyrics. The video was performed by Austin Hall, who later appeared on The Ellen DeGeneres Show. In 2010. The video inspired numerous remakes including the variant Daft Bodies; both videos, along with other viral videos, were referenced in Weezer's "Pork and Beans" music video. (Note: Daft Hands:)

=== Dramatic Chipmunk ===
Dramatic Chipmunk is a viral Internet video. The video is a five-second clip of a prairie dog (erroneously referred to as a chipmunk) turning its head while the camera zooms in and dramatic music is played. Since its release, the video has received over fifty million views. People Magazine named the Dramatic Chipmunk as one of The 10 Wildest YouTube Stars of 2007. (Note: Dramatic Chipmunk:)

=== Freeman's Mind ===
Freeman's Mind is a machinima series created by Ross Scott. Freeman's Mind used the Source remake of the 1998 video game Half-Life. It follows the protagonist of the game, Gordon Freeman, also voiced by Scott, who acts as a combination of narrator and running commentary, often criticizing and satirizing the game world's conventions in a style similar to that in Mystery Science Theater 3000. The series ran from 2007 to 2014 and consisted of 71 episodes. The series was hosted on Machinima until 2014. (Note: Freeman's Mind:)

=== Vote Different ===
Vote Different (or Hillary 1984) is the title of the viral video that combines the footage of the 2008 presidential campaign web announcement by Hillary Clinton with the 1984 Super Bowl commercial by Apple Inc. for the launch of Macintosh. The video shows the same blond female athlete from the 1984 Super Bowl commercial updated with an iPod. The Big Brother image that she throws the sledgehammer at is replaced with Hillary Clinton announcing that she is running for president. (Note: Hillary 1984:)

=== How to solve a Rubik's Cube (Part One) ===
How to solve a Rubik's Cube is a 2007 video by American blogger Dan Brown. It is a tutorial video on how to solve a Rubik's Cube and it went viral. The video got 35,000 views within a day of its upload. It won "Best Instructional" at the 2007 YouTube Awards. As of 2010, the video has over 16 million views. (Note: How to solve a Rubik's Cube:)

=== Italian Spiderman ===
Italian Spiderman is an Australian short film parody of Italian action–adventure films of the 1960s and 1970s, first released on YouTube in 2007. The project began as a trailer for a non-existent film, created by director Dario Russo. It was filmed on one 16mm roll of film in one day. Once it was uploaded online, the trailer went viral and got several million views. (Note: Italian Spiderman:)

=== Keyboard Cat ===
Keyboard Cat is a video-based internet meme. Its original form was a video made in 1984 by Charlie Schmidt of his cat Fatso seemingly playing a musical keyboard (though manipulated by Schmidt off-camera) to a cheery tune. While Schmidt had uploaded the video himself to YouTube in 2007, and became a popular meme. (Note: Keyboard Cat:)

=== Leave Britney Alone! ===
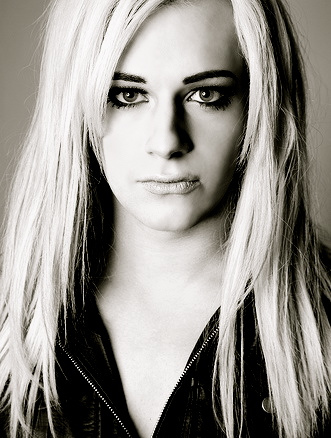
Cara Cunningham from Leave Britney Alone!

Leave Britney Alone! is 2007 viral video where Cara Cunningham is tearfully defended pop singer Britney Spears' comeback performance at the MTV Video Music Awards; the video received over four million views in two days. Many have accused Cunningham of acting in the "Leave Britney Alone!" video, although Cunningham insisted it was genuine on a September 2007 appearance on Maury Povich's Maury show. (Note: Leave Britney Alone!:)

=== Music Is My Hot Hot Sex ===
Music Is My Hot Hot Sex is a single by Brazilian band Cansei de Ser Sexy from their first album Cansei de Ser Sexy. An 18-year-old British student, Nick Haley, used the song in a homemade 30-second commercial for the iPod Touch that he created and then posted on the video sharing site YouTube on September 11, 2007. It was removed from the YouTube most-viewed list for a short time pending an investigation by YouTube, but was then reinstated. (Note: Music Is My Hot Hot Sex:)

=== Obey the Walrus ===
Obey the Walrus is a 2007 video that shows clips from the film The Goddess Bunny. Sandie Crisp, also known as the Goddess Bunny, became more widely known when a video, which featured the Star Fox character Andross singing a Spanish version of "Itsy-Bitsy-Spider" before cutting to a scene from the movie of Crisp tap dancing, was first released in 2005 in the form of an online video on eBaum's World and then reuploaded on YouTube in 2007. The video, with the Spanish title "Obedece a la morsa" or, in English, "Obey the Walrus", subsequently went viral. As of 2025 the video reaching more than 8 million views on YouTube. (Note: Obey the Walrus:)

=== Omoide wa Okkusenman! ===
Omoide wa Okkusenman! (ロックマン2 - おっくせんまん or 110 million memories!) is a song that has become an Internet meme in Japan. The original song was composed by Capcom composer Takashi Tateishi as the background music for Doctor Wily's Stage in Mega Man 2 titled "Wily's Castle (Dr. Wily Stage 1)", but was eventually rearranged by an individual solely known as "Blue Fang" (蒼い牙, Aoi Kiba). Lyrics were later written for this version of the song, and then posted to YouTube on February 6, 2007. (Note: Omoide wa Okkusenman!:)

=== Randy Pausch's Last Lecture: Achieving Your Childhood Dreams ===
Randy Pausch's Last Lecture: Achieving Your Childhood Dreams was a lecture given by Carnegie Mellon University computer science professor Randy Pausch on September 18, 2007, that received widespread media coverage, and was the basis for The Last Lecture, a New York Times best-selling book co-authored with Wall Street Journal reporter Jeffrey Zaslow. The video of the speech became an internet sensation, viewed over a million times within its first month on social networking sites such as YouTube, Google video, MySpace, and Facebook. (Note: Really Achieving Your Childhood Dreams:)

=== Rickroll'D ===
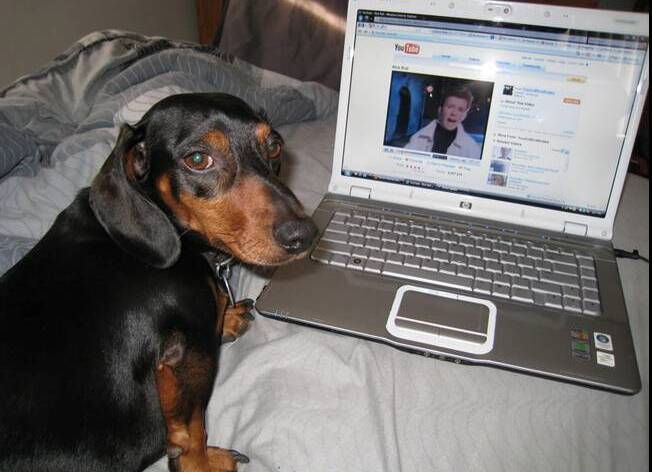
A dog is shown the YouTube video of "Never Gonna Give You Up", demonstrating the mechanism of a rickroll

Rickroll'D is a Rickroll video, which is an Internet meme and prank involving the unexpected appearance of the music video for the 1987 hit song "Never Gonna Give You Up", performed by the English singer Rick Astley. Rickrolling originated on 15 May 2007, when 4chan user Shawn Cotter uploaded the "Never Gonna Give You Up" music video to YouTube and linked to it in place of the trailer for the video game Grand Theft Auto IV. Under the YouTube username cotter548, he uploaded the video, titled "Rickroll'D", on 15 May 2007. In a 2008 April Fools' joke, YouTube made all links to videos on the site's home page end up on the "Never Gonna Give You Up" music video. (Note: Rickrolling:)

=== Potter Puppet Pals: The Mysterious Ticking Noise ===
Potter Puppet Pals: The Mysterious Ticking Noise is a 2007 viral video created by Neil Cicierega. In the video, Severus Snape hears a strange ticking and, noticing it has a catchy rhythm, begins singing his name to it, followed by Albus Dumbledore, Ron Weasley, Hermione Granger, and Harry Potter. Towards the end, Ron discovers that the source of the ticking is a pipe bomb. (Note: Potter Puppet Pals:)

=== The Trouble With Islam ===
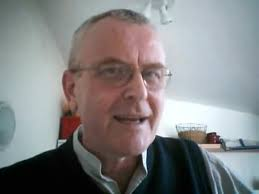
Screenshot from The Trouble With Islam

The Trouble With Islam is a video by Pat Condell, in which he gives a monologue about his criticisms of Islam. Condell said that its popularity proves "there is an enthusiastic audience for comedy ideas and opinions which are routinely censored out of existence in the UK’s mainstream media, thanks to misguided political correctness". The video is under the Creative Commons license. (Note: The trouble with Islam (video):)

=== Thriller ===
Thriller is a viral video featuring the CPDRC Dancing Inmates of a high-security penitentiary. In 2007, the inmates of Cebu Provincial Detention and Rehabilitation Center (CPDRC), a maximum security prison in Cebu, the Philippines, imitated the zombie dance featured in the music video of Michael Jackson's "Thriller". The footage, uploaded onto video-sharing website YouTube, became a viral video. Thriller generated mixed reviews, with some critics claiming that Garcia forced the inmates to perform, an accusation the prisoners refuted. (Note: Thriller (viral video):)

=== Мэр города Харькова Михаил Добкин ===
Video of the production of Mykhailo Dobkin's campaign advertisement (Мэр города Харькова Михаил Добкин) is a video was published on YouTube that contained a montage of leaked takes made in December 2005 in preparation for an electoral campaign ad of Mykhailo Dobkin. The next day, it reached the top 10 of the most popular YouTube videos of the day in the world, and has become a source for many quotes and memes circulated in the Russian internet community. A follow-up video of unclear origin which included fragments supposedly from the same production scene was published in January 2008. (Note: Video of the production of Mykhailo Dobkin's campaign advertisement:)

=== Samwell - "What What (In the Butt)" ===
What What (In the Butt) is a viral video created by Andrew Swant and Bobby Ciraldo for the song of the same name by Samwell. It is known for its numerous blatant and camp references to homosexuality and anal sex. The lyrics of the song, a production of Mike Stasny, mostly revolve around the title. The video was uploaded on Valentine's Day 2007 to YouTube. (Note: What What (In the Butt):)

== 2008 ==
=== Avril Lavigne - Girlfriend (Official Video) ===
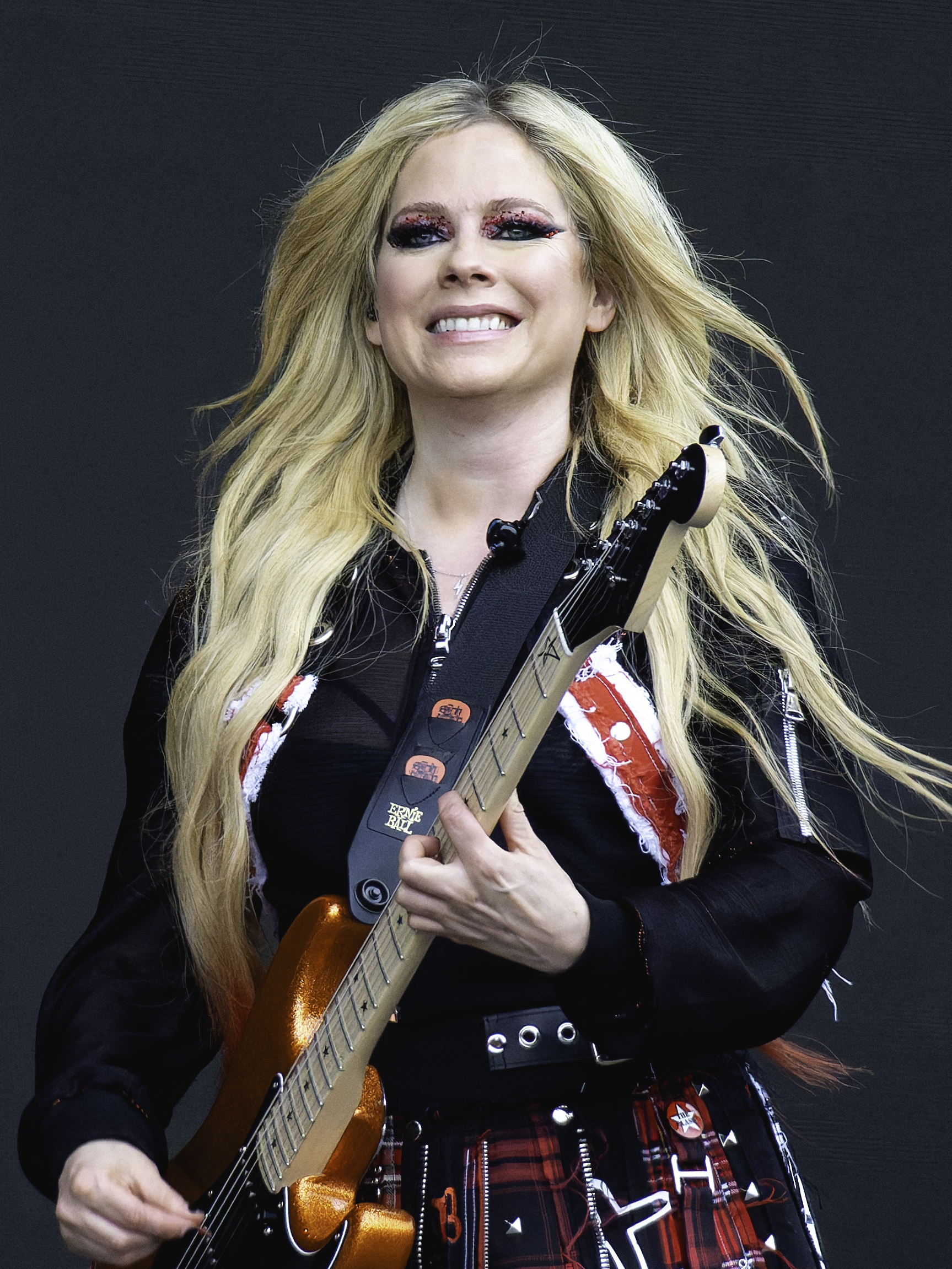
Avril Lavigne from Girlfriend

Girlfriend is a song by Canadian singer-songwriter Avril Lavigne. In 2008, the song became the most viewed video on YouTube, and was the first video on the site to reach 100 million views. CSS's "Music Is My Hot Hot Sex" had allegedly reached that milestone a couple months before, but was removed due to accusations that the views had been fraudulent. In July, Lavigne's manager Terry McBride claimed that the singer was owed $2 million in revenue from YouTube. (Note: Girlfriend (Avril Lavigne song):)

=== A Symphony for YouTube ===
The Internet Symphony No. 1 - "Eroica", is a piece written by the Chinese composer Tan Dun for the YouTube Symphony Orchestra. It was the first of such events where musicians around the world play the same piece virtually via the internet, and the best performers selected were arranged into an internet symphony orchestra, featured on YouTube. (Note: Internet Symphony No. 1:)

=== Jesus Is My Friend by Sonseed ===
Jesus Is My Friend by Sonseed is a 2008 song by Sonseed. The band came back into the spotlight in 2008 when a recording of them performing their song "Jesus Is a Friend of Mine", from a religious TV-show called The First Estate, appeared on the Dougsploitation blog, and subsequently became a YouTube hit. (Note: Jesus Is a Friend of Mine:)

=== Jizz in My Pants ===
Jizz in My Pants is a SNL Digital Short which aired on Saturday Night Live on December 6, 2008, and YouTube on the same day. It serves as the music video for the first single from the Lonely Island's debut album, Incredibad. The video was published first on YouTube along with most of Lonely Island's works. As of May 2022, "Jizz in My Pants" has been watched over 263 million times, making it Lonely Island's second-most popular video ever, after "I Just Had Sex". (Note: Jizz in My Pants:)

=== scarlet takes a tumble (best version) ===
Scarlet Takes a Tumble is a viral video uploaded to YouTube in 2008. In it, Paige Reynolds, a teenage girl, falls off of a table while singing. By 2009, the video had more than 10 million views; as of 2025, it has more than 33 million. Reaction videos to it also became popular online and Reynolds appeared on various talk shows to discuss its virality. (Note: Scarlet Takes a Tumble:)

=== Corrigan Brothers - There's No One As Irish As Barack Obama ===
There's No One as Irish as Barack O'Bama is a humorous folk song written in 2008 by the Irish band Hardy Drew and the Nancy Boys. The song, which received huge publicity in America and was described as a "web hit" by the BBC, became popular after being released on YouTube. (Note: There's No One as Irish as Barack O'Bama:)

=== Footage of a Man Who Spent 41 Hours Trapped in an Elevator ===
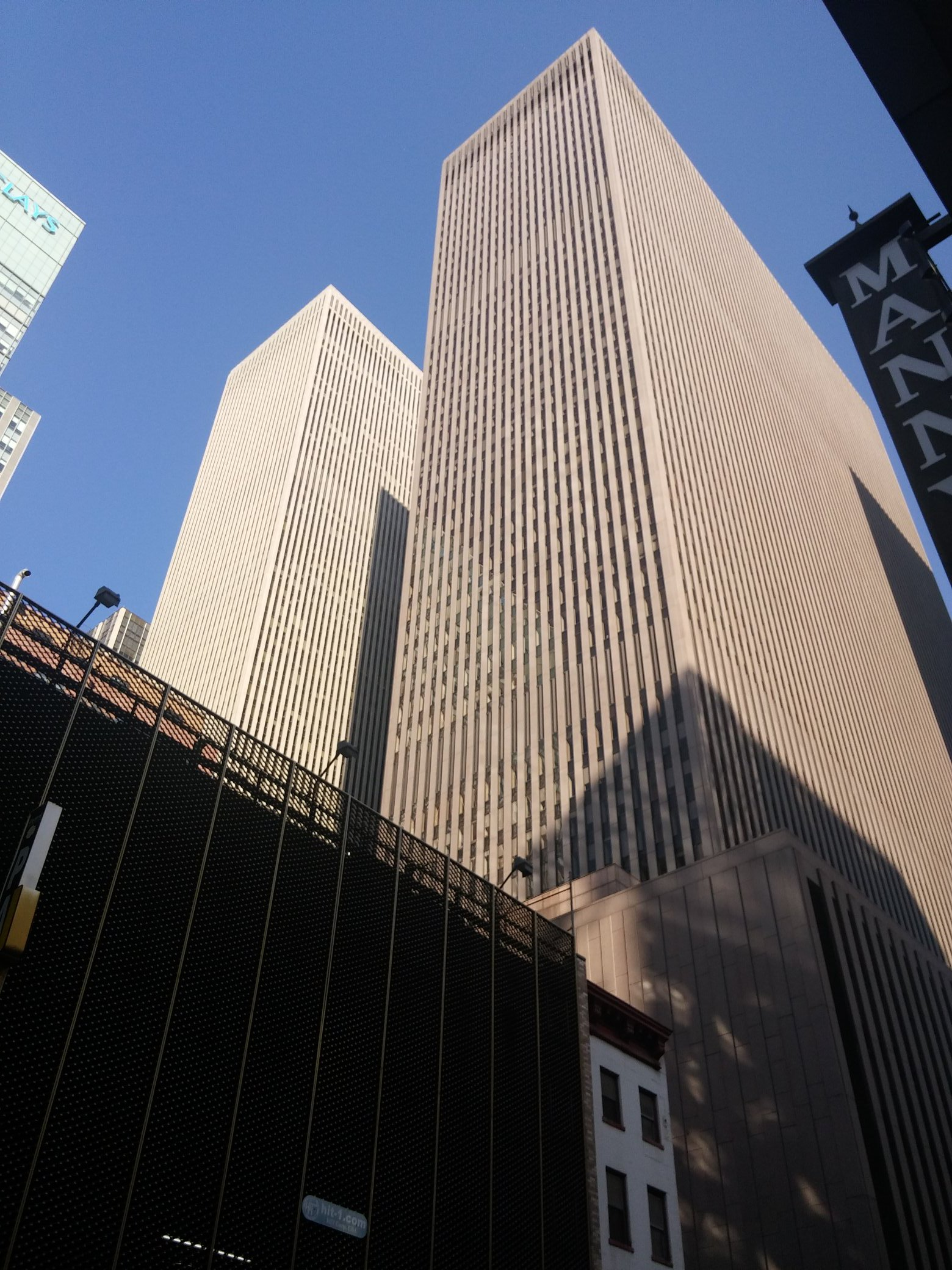
The 1221 Avenue of the Americas skyscraper in 2016

Footage of a Man Who Spent 41 Hours Trapped in an Elevator (or Trapped in an Elevator for 41 Hours) is a video from The New Yorker of the 1999 elevator incident in the 1221 Avenue of the Americas skyscraper. On October 15, 1999, Nicholas White, a Business Week employee whose office was in the building, became trapped in an elevator after a brief power dip caused it to stop between the 13th and 14th floors. White was not rescued until approximately 4:00 p.m. on Sunday, October 17, nearly 41 hours later, after security guards spotted him in the elevator surveillance cameras. (Note: Trapped in an Elevator for 41 Hours:)

=== Trent from Punchy ===
Trent from Punchy is a fictional YouTube celebrity. Trent first appeared in a YouTube video entitled Trent from Punchy, in a reference to the Western Sydney suburb of Punchbowl on 1 February 2008. Trent's antics and language in the original video helped it become a viral sensation, and the character of Trent gathered a cult following. The video had over 2 million views by May 2009. (Note: Trent from Punchy:)

=== Username 666 ===
Username:666 is a Japanese creepypasta screenlife YouTube video released in 2008. Created by PiroPito known online as nana825763. It shows a fictional scenario where a internet user punching "www.youtube.com/666" into their browser and refreshing until they are taken to a heavily distorted, hellish version of the website. (Note: Username:666:)

=== Wario Land: Shake It – Amazing Footage! ===
Wario Land: Shake It – Amazing Footage! is a YouTube advertisement for the 2008 Wii video game Wario Land: Shake It! in which the protagonist Wario does various large-impact actions and collecting items, causing the surrounding YouTube webpage to be destroyed bit by bit while these items accumulate around the page. The YouTube ad campaign was well received by marketing professionals and gaming blogs. (Note: Wario Land: Shake It – Amazing Footage!:)

=== WOMBO COMBO!!!! ===
Wombo Combo is an Internet meme and YouTube video from a December 2008. Melee doubles match that took place at the SCSA West Coast Circuit tournament. The match featured Jeff "SilentSpectre" Leung and Mitchell Tang on one team and Julian Zhu and Joey "Lucky" Aldama on the other. In the match, as Lucky lost all of his lives, SilentSpectre and Tang then performed several moves quickly in tandem, removing Zhu's ability to respond. The commentators of the match – Brandon "HomeMadeWaffles" Collier, Phil DeBerry, and Joseph "Mang0" Marquez – exclaimed "Happy Feet, Wombo Combo. That ain't Falco". They then screamed wildly as SilentSpectre and Tang locked Zhu in a game-winning combo. It has also been used in many "MLG Montage" parody videos. (Note: Wombo Combo:)

== 2009 ==
=== Ataque de pánico! ===
Ataque de pánico! (or Panic Attack!) is a 2009 Uruguayan science fiction short film directed by independent filmmaker Fede Álvarez. The film was premiered on October 31, 2009, at the Buenos Aires Rojo Sangre film festival and uploaded to YouTube on November 3, 2009. Following widespread media coverage, Álvarez was offered a 30-million-dollar Hollywood deal to develop and direct a full-length film. (Note: Ataque de pánico!:)

=== Bale Out: RevoLucian's Christian Bale Remix! ===
Bale Out: RevoLucian's Christian Bale Remix! is a satirical dance remix by American composer Lucian Piane, also known as RevoLucian, released on February 2, 2009, to YouTube and Myspace. hours after the original clip of Bale appeared on the internet. Piane made an MP3 file of "Bale Out" available as a free download from his MySpace page. "Bale Out" had been viewed over 200,000 times one day after it was uploaded to YouTube, and within two days it had received 700,000 hits. (Note: Bale Out:)

=== Best Drag Queen Entrance EVER! ===
Best Drag Queen Entrance EVER! is a video by Tandi Iman Dupree, in the video she performances the song "Wonder Woman" at the Miss Gay Black America pageant in 2001, the video of which went on to become an Internet viral hit after it was uploaded to YouTube in 2009. (Note: Best Drag Queen Entrance EVER!:)

=== David After Dentist ===
David After Dentist is an Internet phenomenon which started when David DeVore Jr.'s father posted a video on the Internet of his reaction to anesthesia after he had been given oral surgery. As of 8 September 2022, it has been viewed 141 million times on YouTube. David DeVore Sr. has received criticism for exploiting his son. DeVore has stated that he appreciates the concern, but feels that it was innocent and has been a positive experience for his family. (Note: David After Dentist:)

=== Democracy Manifest ===
Democracy Manifest is an October 1991 Australian news segment video by the reporter Chris Reason. It shows a man (later identified as Jack Karlson) being arrested by Queensland Police at a Chinese restaurant. As the police forcibly detain him, he remarks in a stentorian tone, "Gentlemen, this is democracy manifest!", "What is the charge? Eating a meal? A succulent Chinese meal?", "Get your hand off my penis!", and, after an aborted attempt by a police officer to headlock him, "I see that you know your judo well." (Note: Democracy Manifest:)

=== Disgusting Domino's People ===
Disgusting Domino's People is a series of five viral videos uploaded to YouTube on April 13, 2009, which depict a male employee at a Domino's Pizza restaurant, Michael Setzer, contaminating ingredients with his nostrils and buttocks while a co-worker, Kristy Hammonds, narrates that items with those ingredients will go out to customers. (Note: Disgusting Domino's People:)

=== I'm on a Boat ===
I'm on a Boat is a single from The Lonely Island's debut album Incredibad. It was also featured as a Saturday Night Live Digital Short. The song features R&B singer T-Pain. The song, produced by Wyshmaster, is a parody of many rap video clichés, especially the music video for the Jay-Z song "Big Pimpin'." The music video reached number one on YouTube in February 2009 and was number one on the US iTunes music video chart. (Note: I'm on a Boat:)

=== JK Wedding Entrance Dance ===
JK Wedding Entrance Dance is a viral video originally uploaded to YouTube on July 19, 2009, featuring the wedding of Jill Peterson and Kevin Heinz, using "Forever" by Chris Brown as the song for their wedding march. In its first 48 hours, the video accumulated more than 3.5 million views. The original upload of the video was the third most popular video on YouTube in 2009, and as of July 2021 had been viewed over 100 million times. (Note: JK Wedding Entrance Dance:)

=== THE LONGEST WAY 1.0 - 350 days of hiking through China - TIMELAPSE. ===
The Longest Way is a 2009 viral video uploaded by Christoph Rehage. The video features Rehage walking 4,646 km (2,887 mi) from Beijing to Ürümqi during 2007 and 2008. It has received over 50 million views, as of August 2022. TIME listed the video as the #8 top viral video of 2009. (Note: The Longest Way:)

=== Marble Hornets ===
Left to right: Tim Sutton, Troy Wagner, Joseph DeLage, the creators of Marble Hornets

Marble Hornets is an alternate reality YouTube web series based on the Slender Man online mythos. The first video was posted on YouTube on June 20, 2009, following a post that its creator, Troy Wagner, created on the Something Awful forum the previous day. It was the first web series to be created around the character, and the first Marble Hornets affiliated post being 9 days after the character's creation. (Note: Marble Hornets:)

=== Me and My Dick ===
Me and My Dick is a musical with music and lyrics by A.J. Holmes, Carlos Valdes, and Darren Criss, Me and My Dick is a coming of age tale about a "boy with a very special relationship with his very best friend ... his Dick! Together they face the trials of growing up, love, sex and high school, but these two best pals are in for the adventure of a lifetime." (Note: Me and My Dick:)

=== R U Professional ===
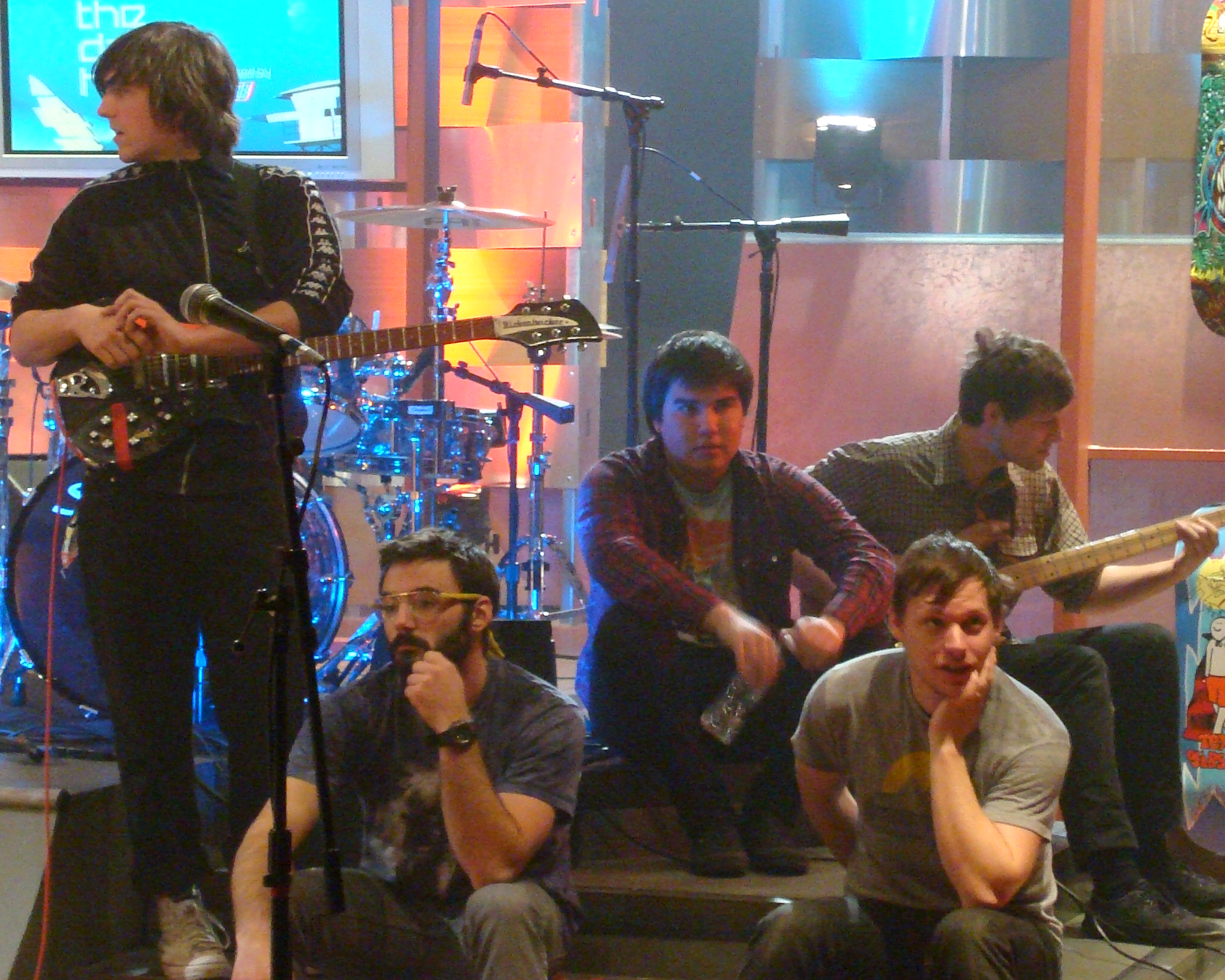
The Mae Shi band members from R U Professional

R U Professional is a 2009 satirical song by the American indie rock band The Mae Shi, inspired by a July 2008 outburst by actor Christian Bale on the set of Terminator Salvation. R U Professional was made available on YouTube and MediaFire on February 3, 2009. The video description on YouTube by the group stated, "Song By The Mae Shi celebrating the life and work of Xtian Bale. (Note: R U Professional:)

=== Saturday Morning Watchmen ===
Saturday Morning Watchmen is a Newgrounds and YouTube viral video published on March 5, 2009, the day before the release of the live-action Watchmen film.The video parodies the DC Comics limited series Watchmen by Alan Moore and Dave Gibbons, portraying the opening sequence of a fictional 1980s Saturday morning cartoon based on the series. (Note: Saturday Morning Watchmen:)

=== Star Wars: The Phantom Menace Review ===
Star Wars: The Phantom Menace Review is a series of seven videos forming a 70-minute review of and commentary on Star Wars: Episode I – The Phantom Menace (1999). Milwaukee filmmaker Mike Stoklasa performed the review in the persona of Harry S. Plinkett, an elderly, mentally deranged man. Plinkett criticises the film, inter alia, for lacking well-defined characters, not having a clear protagonist and having dull cinematography with overreliance on shot/reverse shot. Behind-the-scenes footage of the Phantom Menace production is used to portray writer-director George Lucas as excessively powerful and surrounded by yes-men, in contrast to the original trilogy. Stoklasa was motivated to produce a Plinkett review for The Phantom Menace due to his dislike of the Star Wars prequel trilogy. Stoklasa's review of The Phantom Menace went viral, receiving over a million views in the first four months of its release, and being shared on social media by Simon Pegg and Damon Lindelof. The review is considered as a landmark of the video essay format, and helped to build long-form video reviews into a popular genre. Red Letter Media has continued to be popular as a media review channel, although it has moved away from the Plinkett character. (Note: Star Wars: The Phantom Menace Review:)

=== A Very Potter Musical ===
A Very Potter Musical is a musical with music and lyrics by Darren Criss and A. J. Holmes and a book by Matt Lang, Nick Lang and Brian Holden. The story is a parody, based on several of the Harry Potter novels by J. K. Rowling. The story of Harry Potter's return to Hogwarts School of Witchcraft and Wizardry, his participation in the House Cup Championship, the trials and tribulations of adolescence, and the return of the dark wizard Lord Voldemort and the Golden Trio's attempts to destroy the Horcruxes. (Note: A Very Potter Musical:)

== See also ==
- List of notable YouTube videos of the 2010s
- List of notable YouTube videos of the 2020s
- List of most-viewed YouTube videos
- List of viral videos
