= List of notable YouTube videos of the 2020s =

YouTube logo from 2024

This is a list of YouTube videos from the 2020s that journalists, online newspaper, or magazines have written about. To be considered for this list: the videos must be included on many separate articles from different publications (inclusive of all time periods), as chosen by their editorial staff. Each video must be recognised mainly for its corresponding YouTube upload, and already has an article on Wikipedia.

== 2020 ==
=== 2 HOURS Doing Nothing ===
2 JAM Nggak Ngapa-ngapain is a two-hour video created by Madurese YouTuber Muhammad Didit, published on his YouTube channel Sobat Miskin Official (Official Broke Gang) on 10 July 2020 at 11:21:44 UTC. The video features Didit staring at the camera in his bedroom for two hours. It was originally intended to be a 10-minute video. It surpassed four million views and a mobile game of the same name was later published. (Note: 2 Hours Doing Nothing:)

=== An Evening With Tim Heidecker | Stand-Up Special ===
An Evening with Tim Heidecker is the first stand-up comedy special from American comedian Tim Heidecker, released on October 23, 2020. The material was filmed in Los Angeles in 2017 and had been part of bits that Heidecker workshopped for a decade. The onstage persona is based on Heidecker seeing comedians fail onstage. (Note: An Evening with Tim Heidecker:)

=== Farewell, Sarah Jane | Doctor Who ===
Farewell, Sarah Jane is a YouTube special connected to The Sarah Jane Adventures which was created as part of a series of Doctor Who-related webcasts during the in order to honor Elisabeth Sladen following her death in 2011, which halted production of the show's final series. The special received high viewership and was talked about heavily, so much so that "SubwaveNetwork," a reference to the Doctor Who story the special was paired with, trended as a hashtag at one number one worldwide. Producer Emily Cook was pleased with the positive responses the story got. (Note: Farewell, Sarah Jane:)

=== Holding a Black Lives Matter Sign in America's Most Racist Town ===
Holding a Black Lives Matter Sign in America's Most Racist Town is a video by American filmmaker Rob Bliss, uploaded on YouTube on July 27, 2020. The video shows Bliss holding up a Black Lives Matter sign at Harrison, Arkansas, a place regarded as "America's Most Racist Town". Before the video, Bliss also made 10 Hours of Walking in NYC as a Woman, another video about social issues. The video drew national media coverage. It drew criticism from Harrison officials, including Mayor Jerry Jackson. (Note: Holding a Black Lives Matter Sign in America's Most Racist Town:)

=== Gal Gadot singing Imagine with other stars ===
Gal Gadot singing Imagine with other stars is a video of Israeli actress Gal Gadot and two dozen celebrity friends singing a rendition of the song "Imagine" by John Lennon, which was intended to raise morale in the face of the COVID-19 pandemic. The video was poorly received. (Note: Imagine (Gal Gadot video):)

=== Life in a Day 2020 | Official Documentary ===
Life in a Day 2020 is a 2021 American crowd-sourced documentary film directed by Kevin Macdonald. The sequel to the 2011 film Life in a Day, it premiered at the Sundance Film Festival on February 1, 2021, and on YouTube February 6, to generally favorable critical reviews. Like its predecessor, it comprises a wide array of selected video clips showing things happening in the world on one day: July 25, 2020. (Note: Life in a Day 2020:)

=== Plandemic: The Hidden Agenda Behind Covid-19 ===
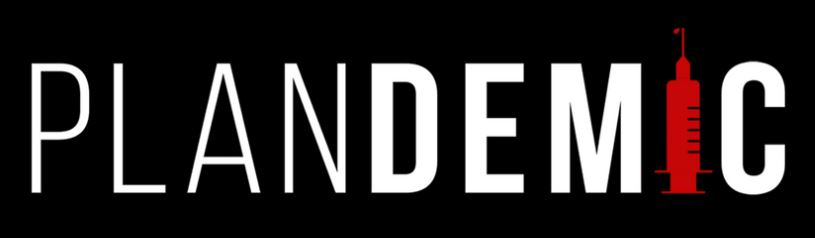
Logo used for Plandemic: The Hidden Agenda Behind Covid-19

Plandemic: The Hidden Agenda Behind Covid-19 is the first of a trilogy of conspiracy theory films produced by Mikki Willis, promoting misinformation about the COVID-19 pandemic. They feature Judy Mikovits, a discredited American researcher and prominent anti-vaccine activist. The first video, was released on May 4, 2020, under Willis's production company Elevate Films. Upon its release, the first video went viral, becoming one of the most widespread pieces of COVID-19 misinformation, its popularity most attributed to online word-of-mouth. It was quickly removed by multiple online platforms, but this failed to stop its proliferation. The video also plausibly contributed to non-compliance with health protocols. (Note: Plandemic:)

=== Planet Lockdown ===
Planet Lockdown is a film containing misinformation about COVID-19 that was banned on YouTube and Facebook. The video's producers describe it as a documentary. The 90-minute film was directed by James Patrick, and released online in December 2020. In addition to being shared on social media, the video was released on the Planet Lockdown website. (Note: Planet Lockdown:)

=== Speaking Moistly ===
"Speaking Moistly" is a remix song of Canadian prime minister Justin Trudeau's voice edited by Brock Tyler, known on YouTube as anonymotif. It is based on Trudeau's words from a press conference regarding the COVID-19 pandemic in Canada. The quote "speaking moistly" refers to respiratory droplets that are spit out when one speaks, which can potentially spread COVID-19. (Note: Speaking Moistly:)

=== Wilbur Soot - Your New Boyfriend (OFFICIAL VIDEO) ===
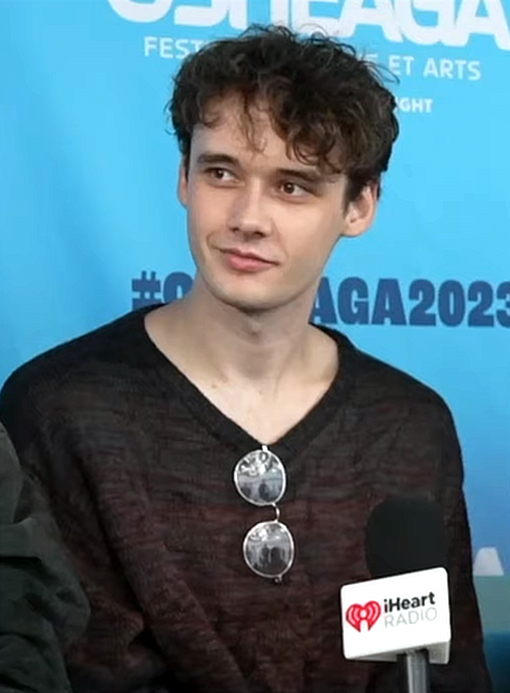
Wilbur Soot from Your New Boyfriend

"Your New Boyfriend" is a comedy song by English singer-songwriter, YouTuber, and Twitch streamer William Gold, better known online as Wilbur Soot, released on 11 December 2020. The song connects to Gold's previous 2020 singles, "I'm in Love with an E-Girl" and "Internet Ruined Me", completing a trilogy of songs about a teenage boy who is infatuated with an e-girl. (Note: Your New Boyfriend:)

== 2021 ==
=== $456,000 Squid Game in Real Life! ===
"$456,000 Squid Game in Real Life!" is a YouTube video by American YouTuber Jimmy Donaldson, known on the platform as MrBeast. The video, released on November 24, 2021, is a competition based on the games featured in the 2021 South Korean Netflix show Squid Game. Donaldson began work on the video in October 2021. Partially funded by Finnish video game developer Supercell to promote its mobile game Brawl Stars, the video cost US$3.5 million to produce, of which $2 million was spent on sets and production and $1.5 million was given as cash prizes to the contestants. After the video was published on November 24, 2021, it quickly received over 100 million views and became MrBeast's most-viewed video (not including Shorts). As of July 2025, it has received over 850 million views. (Note: $456,000 Squid Game in Real Life!:)

=== Day of Rage: How Trump Supporters Took the U.S. Capitol ===
Day of Rage: How Trump Supporters Took the U.S. Capitol is a 2021 American documentary short film about the January 6 Capitol attack by supporters of former president Donald Trump, reported by The New York Times. The video received positive reviews. It was shortlisted for the Academy Award for Best Documentary Short Subject, but ultimately was not nominated. The video had earned 68,000 comments on YouTube. The video also won the Alfred I. duPont–Columbia University Award and Peabody Award. It was nominated for two News & Documentary Emmy Awards the following year. (Note: Day of Rage: How Trump Supporters Took the U.S. Capitol:)

=== Hello 2021 ===
Hello 2021 was a series of five localized virtual New Year's Eve countdown specials which were broadcast on YouTube on December 31, 2020. Originating from the Americas, the United Kingdom, South Korea, Japan and India, the specials celebrated the most notable videos of the year 2020 and also featured musical performances and guest celebrity appearances. It was co-produced by YouTube and Fremantle. (Note: Hello 2021:)

=== Mask (Official Music Video) ===
"Mask" is the second single by American YouTuber Dream. It was released on May 21, 2021, through Dream Music. "Mask" is more rock-influenced than Dream's previous song, "Roadtrip", and lyrically details his past and present struggles with attention deficit hyperactivity disorder (ADHD). "Mask" performed well commercially, receiving one million streams in its first week and becoming Dream's first top-40 single on the UK Singles Chart, where it reached number 38. The song's accompanying animated music video, released in June 2021, was negatively received by viewers for its quality and messages, and became an internet meme. (Note: Mask (Dream song):)

=== Putin's Palace. History of World's Largest Bribe ===
Putin's Palace. History of World's Largest Bribe is a 2021 Russian documentary film by the Anti-Corruption Foundation (FBK). The film investigates the residence commonly known as "Putin's Palace" that it claims was constructed for Russian president Vladimir Putin and details a corruption scheme headed by Putin involving the construction of the palace. The film estimates that the residence, located near the town of Gelendzhik in Krasnodar Krai, cost over ₽100 billion (approximately $1.35 billion) with what it says was "the largest bribe in history". (Note: Putin's Palace (film):)

=== Roblox Pressured Us to Delete Our Video. So We Dug Deeper. ===
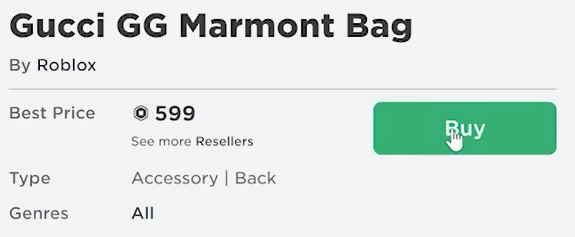
Cropped screenshot from Roblox Pressured Us to Delete Our Video. So We Dug Deeper.

Roblox Pressured Us to Delete Our Video. So We Dug Deeper. is a followup video by People Make Games and released in December 2021. In the video they further accused the platform of having child safety issues and criticized its "collectibles stock market" by likening it to gambling. (Note: People Make Games#Roblox):)

== 2022 ==
=== It's Corn - Songify This ft. Tariq and Recess Therapy ===
"It's Corn" is a song by The Gregory Brothers. The song remixes portions of an August 2022 interview of Tariq with Julian Shapiro-Barnum on Recess Therapy. The song was released on August 28, 2022, on YouTube and went viral on social media platforms. After the interview, seven-year-old Tariq was dubbed the CEO of Corn, and nicknamed the "Corn Kid". On September 4, 2022, Kevin Bacon covered the song and posted it on Instagram and later YouTube. (Note: It's Corn:)

=== Louis Theroux - Jiggle Jiggle (Official Lyric Video) ft. Duke & Jones ===
"Jiggle Jiggle" is a 2022 single by British-American journalist and documentary maker Louis Theroux, produced by Manchester-based DJ duo Duke & Jones (Isaac McKelvey and Luke Conibear). The song was created based on a rap trend that Theroux had been involved in, featuring a snippet of him rapping on the "Gangsta Rap" episode of the show Weird Weekends. As of 26 December 2022, the song has garnered over 20 million views on YouTube. (Note: Jiggle Jiggle:)

=== Line Goes Up – The Problem with NFTs ===
Line Goes Up – The Problem With NFTs is a 2022 documentary film written and directed by Canadian YouTuber and video essayist Dan Olson on non-fungible tokens (NFTs), cryptocurrencies, and Web3. The video was published to his YouTube channel Folding Ideas on January 21, 2022. As of June 2024, the documentary had 14.8 million views with 428 thousand likes. Two critics highlighted it in the 2022 Sight and Sound video essay poll. (Note: Line Goes Up – The Problem with NFTs:)

=== THE INSIDE OUTTAKES - Bo Burnham (4K) ===
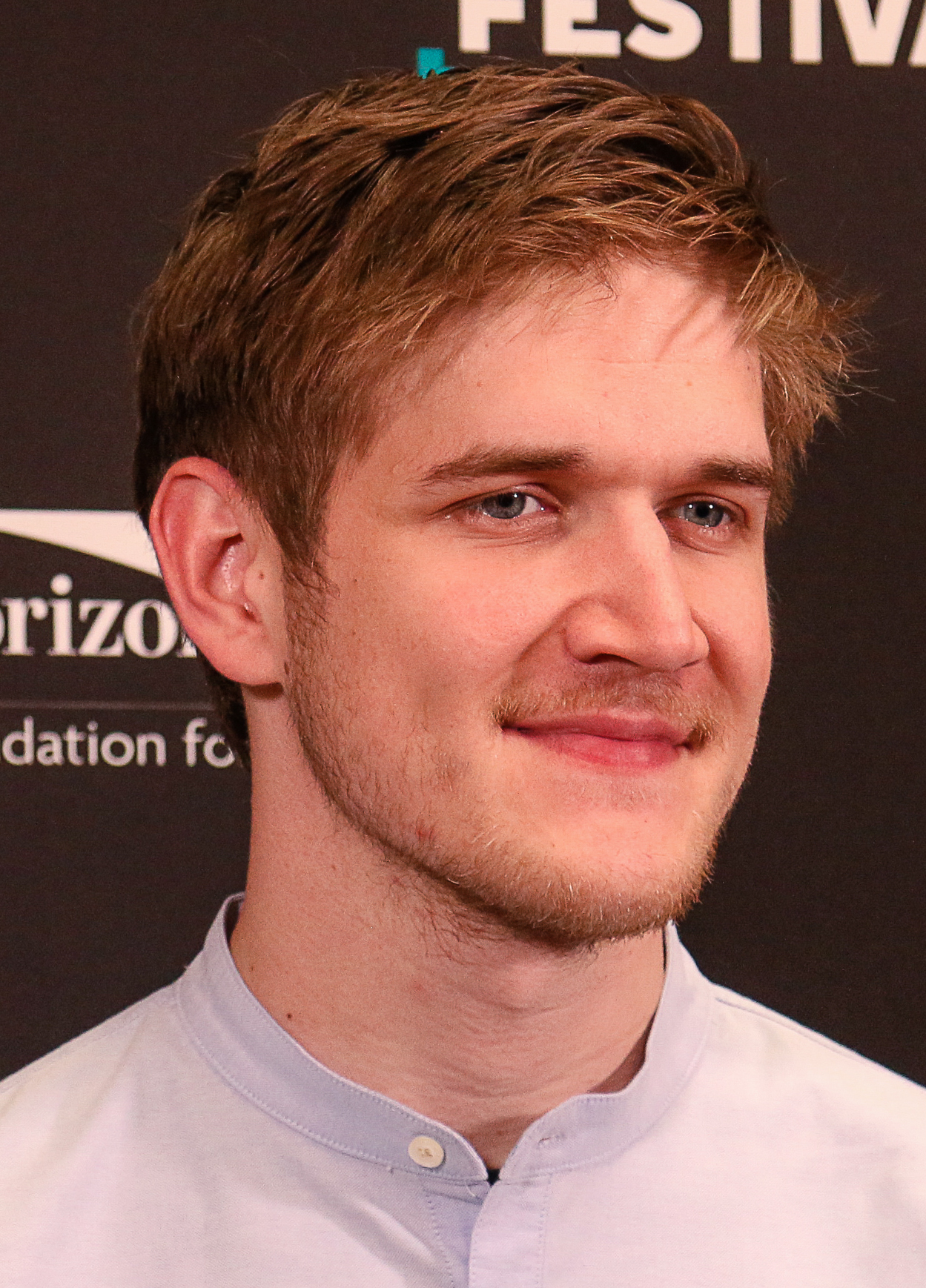
Bo Burnham from THE INSIDE OUTTAKES - Bo Burnham (4K)

On May 30, 2022, Burnham marked the first anniversary of his Netflix comedy special, Inside, by premiering the hour-long The Inside Outtakes via YouTube. He announced that he would be posting the video one hour beforehand. The video was edited by Burnham from April to May 2022. The outtakes were also released on Netflix on August 11, 2022. (Note: The Inside Outtakes:)

== 2023 ==
=== Gaza's sky is black but Qatar is always sunny ===
"Gaza's sky is black but Qatar is always sunny" is a single by the Israeli satirical TV show Eretz Nehederet. Released during the Gaza war, the video features three Israeli comedians, Yaniv Biton, Shahar Hasson, and Mariano Idelman, portraying Hamas leaders Ismail Haniyeh, Khaled Mashaal and Mousa Abu Marzouk respectively, who are estimated by the Israeli embassy to the United States as having a combined net worth of $11 billion. The song is a parody of Thai rapper Lisa's 2021 single "Money". The video was positively received by Israeli audiences and their corresponding newspapers. As of April 2024, the YouTube video for the single, initially released in December 2023, has accumulated nearly 2.5 million views. (Note: Gaza's sky is black but Qatar is always sunny:)

=== Grand Theft Auto VI Trailer 1 ===
Grand Theft Auto VI Trailer 1 is the first trailer for the video game Grand Theft Auto VI, released on 4 December 2023. The trailer broke the record for most first-day views on a non-music YouTube video within 12 hours, with 46 million, and, within 24 hours, became the third-most-viewed overall, with 93 million, and most-liked game trailer, with 8.9 million. It surpassed the lifetime viewership of Grand Theft Auto V's 2011 reveal trailer within two days, with 101 million views, and became the second-most-viewed game trailer by January, with 168 million. (Note: Grand Theft Auto VI Trailer 1:)

=== Hi. ===
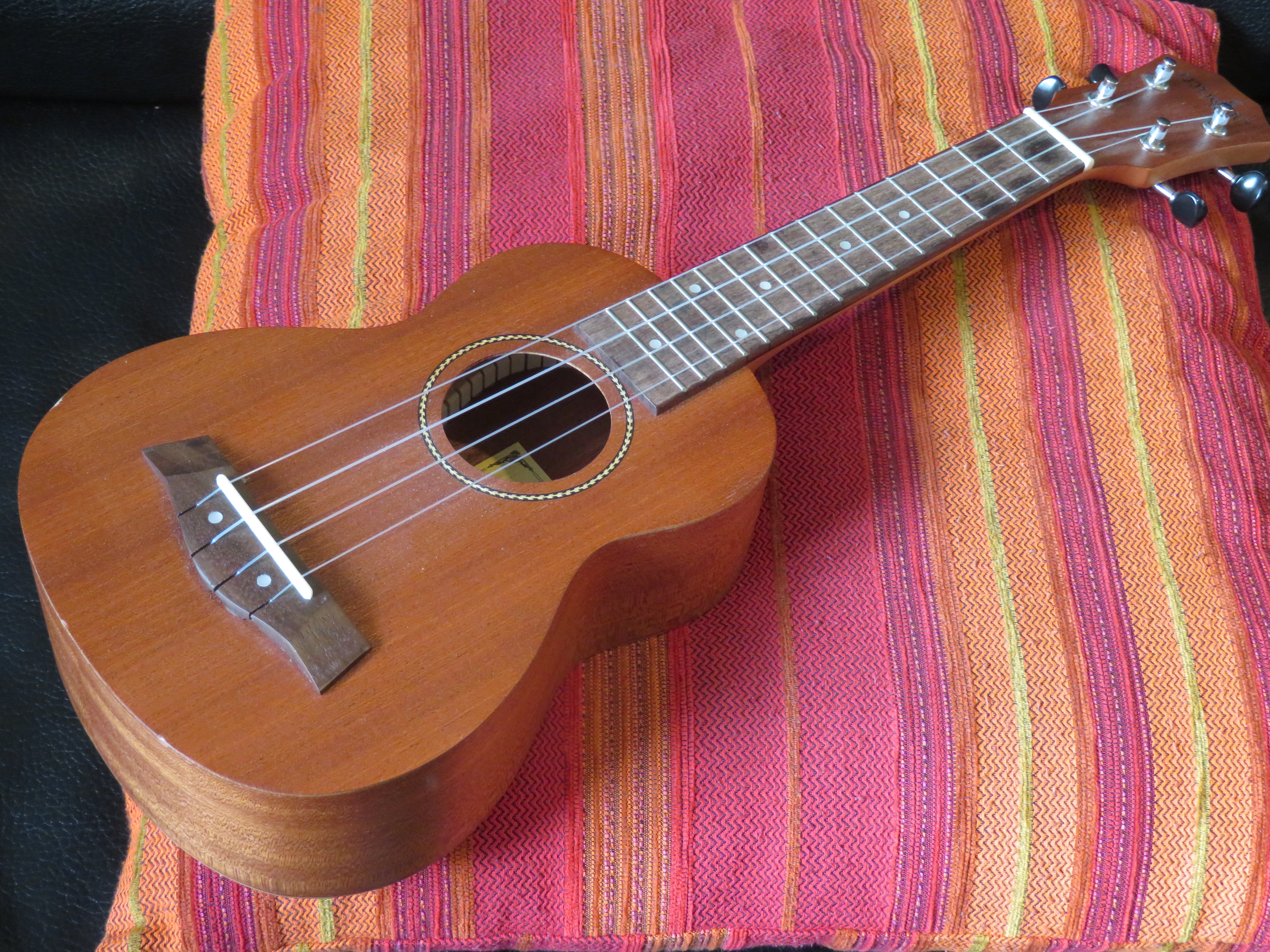
Ballinger was criticized for using a ukulele (pictured) in her apology video.

Hi. is a video by Colleen Ballinger, the video is a response video, while singing and playing the ukulele in which she admitted that she had made mistakes but denied being a groomer and called the accusations "lies" and "gossip ... made up for clout". The video received negative comments and was widely parodied online. (Note: Hi. (video):)

=== Plagiarism and You(Tube) ===
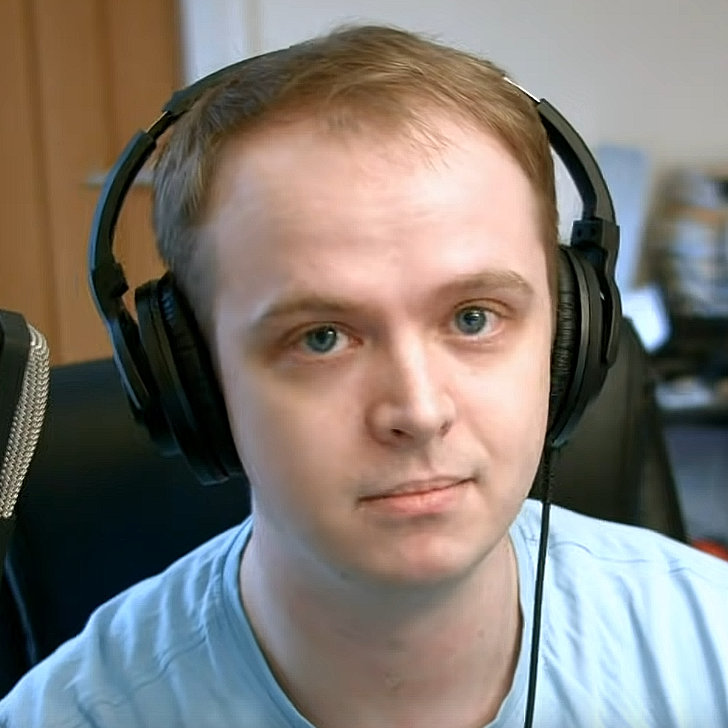
Harry Brewis from Plagiarism and You(Tube)

Plagiarism and You(Tube) is a nearly four-hour video essay that released on 2 December 2023, in which he discussed plagiarism and presented accusations and evidence of plagiarism against YouTubers Filip Miucin, Cinemassacre, iilluminaughtii, Internet Historian, and James Somerton. The second half of the video focuses exclusively on Somerton, whom Brewis accuses of expansive plagiarism, as well as appropriating content from various other queer writers and content creators. The Celluloid Closet, a 1996 film based on the book of the same name by Vito Russo, and Tinker Belles and Evil Queens, a 2000 book by Sean Griffin, were among the works Somerton was accused of plagiarizing, in part or in whole, across at least 26 of his videos. (Note: Plagiarism and You(Tube):)

=== The Original Shrek Test from 1995 ===
Shrek – I Feel Good Animation Test is a 1995 American test animation by Propellerheads for DreamWorks Animation, which would become a basis to the 2001 animated fantasy comedy film Shrek. The animation test is set to James Brown's 1965 single "I Got You (I Feel Good)". Shrek's voice was provided by Chris Farley and Tom Kenny voices a mugger. On November 23, 2023, production designer Barry E. Jackson released the test on his YouTube channel, The Zoom Art Studio, following an interview. (Note: Shrek – I Feel Good Animation Test:)

== 2024 ==
=== 50 YouTubers Fight for $1,000,000 ===
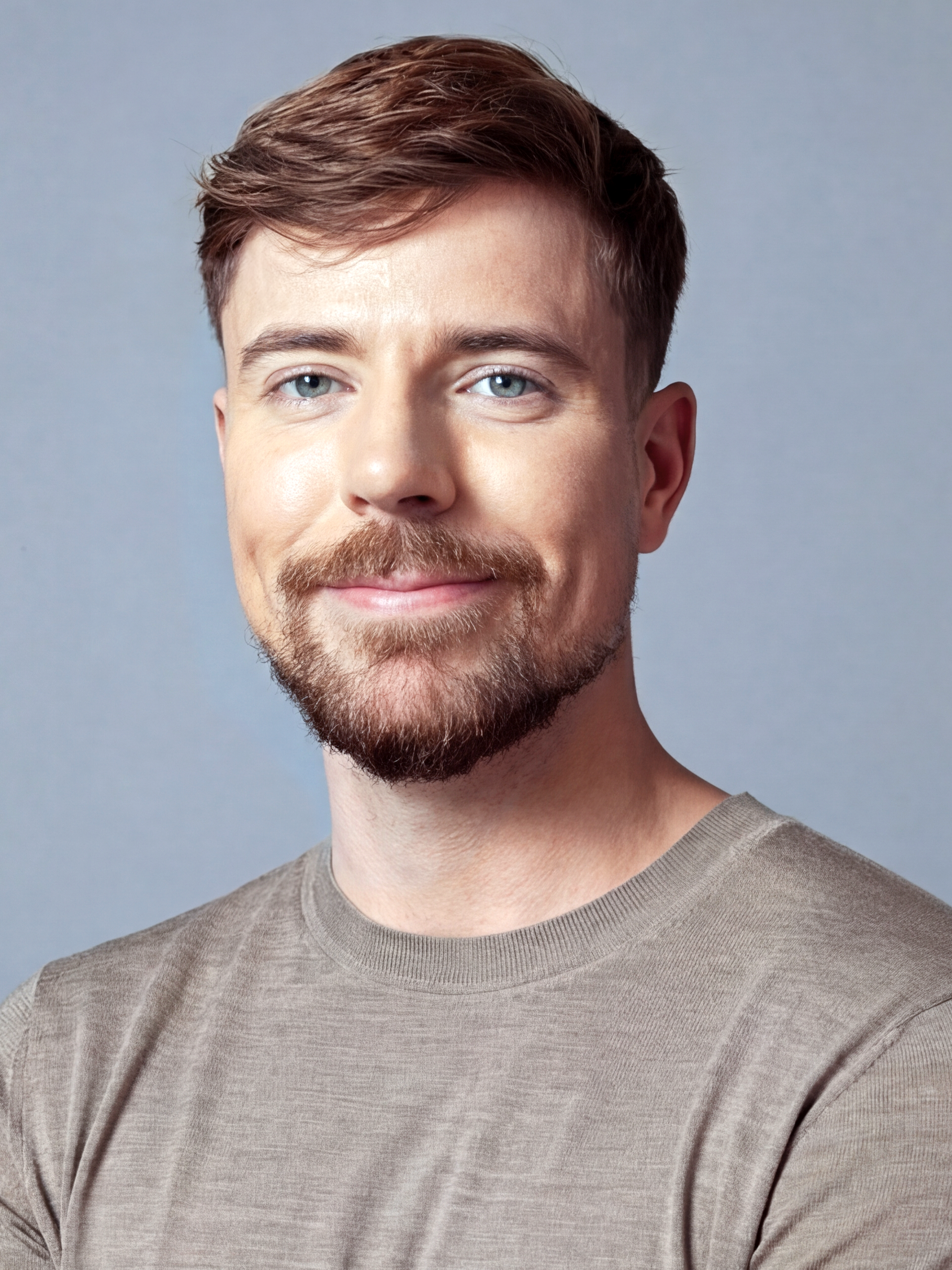
American YouTube personality MrBeast is the most-subscribed channel on YouTube, with 507 million subscribers.

"50 YouTubers Fight for $1,000,000" is a YouTube video by American YouTuber Jimmy Donaldson, known on the platform as MrBeast. The video, described by Donaldson as his "biggest video ever," featured fifty YouTubers from around the world competing to stay inside a large glass cube for as long as possible while completing challenges. It received over 70 million views in 24 hours, making it his most-viewed video in that time frame. (Note: 50 YouTubers Fight for $1,000,000:)

=== Conan O'Brien Needs a Doctor While Eating Spicy Wings ===
"Conan O'Brien Needs a Doctor While Eating Spicy Wings" is the twelfth and final episode of the twenty-third season of the American talk show Hot Ones. The episode premiered on YouTube on April 11, 2024. In the episode, host Sean Evans interviews television host and comedian Conan O'Brien. O'Brien's appearance on Hot Ones is regarded as one of the series's greatest. (Note: Conan O'Brien Needs a Doctor While Eating Spicy Wings:)

=== George Carlin: I'm Glad I'm Dead ===
"George Carlin: I'm Glad I'm Dead" is a video by Dudesy released in January 2024 the hour-long YouTube special titled which was presented as Dudesy's impersonation of George Carlin, using a generative AI clone of the late comedian's voice. The special is another stand-up routine, with Dudesy's introductory voiceover saying that "I listened to all of George Carlin's material and did my best to imitate his voice, cadence and attitude as well as the subject matter I think would have interested him today." The special uses this impersonation to discuss contemporary events. (Note: George Carlin: I'm Glad I'm Dead:)

=== I Worked for MrBeast, He's a Fraud ===
I Worked for MrBeast, He's a Fraud is a video by DogPack404 released on July 24, 2024, in the video DogPack404, accusing MrBeast of staging contests, running illegal lotteries, falsifying signatures, and misleading viewers. He followed with an interview of former staffer Jake Weddle, who described being denied sleep during productions, said the team employed Jake Franklin's brother-in-law despite his status as a registered sex offender, and alleged that a cameraman tried to intoxicate female participants with paint fumes. Weddle identified the cameraman as "Delaware", claiming Donaldson knew about his conviction, which stemmed from an incident when Delaware was 16 and the victim was 11. (Note: I Worked for MrBeast, He's a Fraud:)

=== THE SPIDER WITHIN: A SPIDER-VERSE STORY | Official Short Film (Full) | Sony Animation ===
The Spider Within: A Spider-Verse Story is a 2023 American animated psychological thriller short film featuring the Marvel Comics character Miles Morales (voiced by Shameik Moore) and produced by Sony Pictures Animation and Sony Pictures Imageworks. Taking place between Spider-Man: Into the Spider-Verse (2018) and Spider-Man: Across the Spider-Verse , the short, directed by Jarelle Dampier and written by Khaila Amazan. It was later released on YouTube on March 27, 2024. (Note: The Spider Within: A Spider-Verse Story:)

=== The largest campaign ever to stop publishers destroying games ===
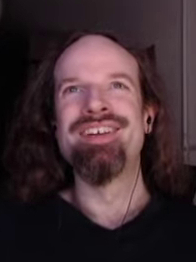
Ross Scott from The largest campaign ever to stop publishers destroying games

The largest campaign ever to stop publishers destroying games is a video by Ross Scott introducing Stop Killing Games and launched a website for the campaign. The movement was started in 2024 after the shutdown of Ubisoft's The Crew, a racing game that required a constant internet connection despite being mainly single-player. A central concern of the movement involves online-only games and downloadable content being listed on storefronts prominently as a purchase, instead of as a rent or lease, despite the possibility of access being remotely denied to the purchaser by the publisher unilaterally. (Note: The largest campaign ever to stop publishers destroying games:)

=== Exclusive: Tucker Carlson Interviews Vladimir Putin ===
"The Vladimir Putin Interview" is a television interview hosted by the American journalist and political commentator Tucker Carlson with the Russian president Vladimir Putin. It premiered on the Tucker Carlson Network and the social media website Twitter on February 8, 2024. It is the first interview to have been conducted between Putin and a Western journalist since the Russian invasion of Ukraine began on February 24, 2022. Most of the conversation between the two men was focused on the Russo-Ukrainian War, as well as the dynamic between Russia and NATO since the dissolution of the Soviet Union in 1991. Historians have pointed out many false claims in Putin's statements. (Note: Tucker Carlson's interview with Vladimir Putin:)

=== Two Steps Ahead ===
Two Steps Ahead is a video by Nikocado Avocado, released on September 6, 2024. In the video Perry revealed that he had lost over 250 pounds (110 kg), which gained over 26 million views in 48 hours. In the video, Perry revealed that he secretly lost the weight over the past two years and hid this fact by uploading pre-recorded content during that time, calling it the "greatest social experiment of [his] entire life". (Note: Two Steps Ahead:)

=== The Vanishing of S.S. Willie (Horror Short Film) ===
The Vanishing of S.S. Willie is a 2024 short horror film written and directed by Nick Lives. It uses the American public domain status of the short animated film Steamboat Willie, featuring the earliest version of Mickey Mouse. The film was released via YouTube on January 1, 2024, and is credited as the first released film to have been derived from Steamboat Willie since the cartoon entered the public domain. (Note: The Vanishing of S.S. Willie:)

== 2025 ==
=== Change your profile picture to clippy. I'm serious ===
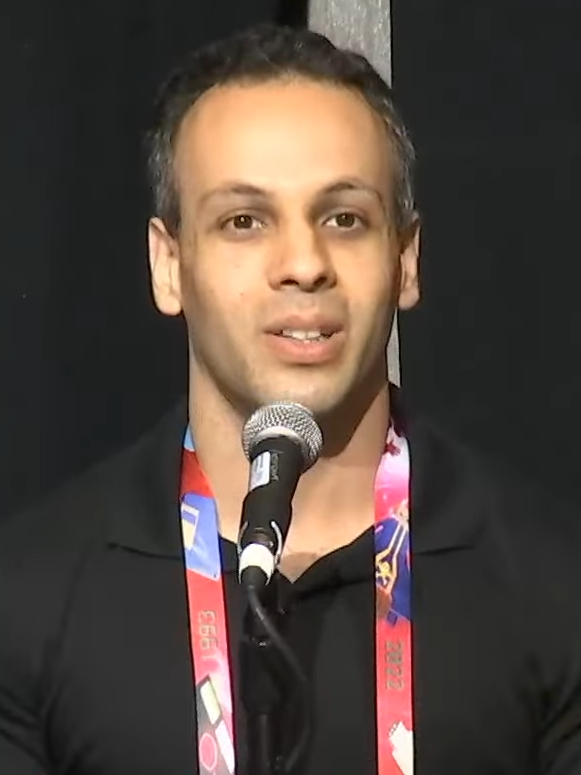
Louis Rossmann from Change your profile picture to clippy. I'm serious

Change your profile picture to clippy. I'm serious is video by YouTuber and activist Louis Rossmann. In the video, he encouraged viewers to switch their profile pictures to the Clippit to protest unfair business practices and data harvesting from users by companies to train artificial intelligence models. (Note: Change your profile picture to clippy. I'm serious:)

=== Grand Theft Auto VI Trailer 2 ===
Grand Theft Auto VI Trailer 2 is the second trailer for the video game Grand Theft Auto VI, released on 6 May 2025. The video revealing the protagonists' full names. It features the Pointer Sisters's song "Hot Together"—which saw a 182,000% increase in Spotify streams—as Rockstar Games reiterated the trailer was composed of cutscenes and gameplay recorded on the PlayStation 5, following some viewers' doubts due to the high graphical fidelity. The trailer received over 475 million views within 24 hours across all platforms. (Note: Grand Theft Auto VI Trailer 2:)

=== JOHANNE SACREBLU "the musical" a tribute to EMILIA PEREZ ===
Johanne Sacreblu is a 2025 Mexican comedy musical short film directed by filmmaker Camila Aurora and written by Héctor Guillén. It was created as a parody of and protest against the French film Emilia Pérez. The film premiered on YouTube in January 2025 and makes use of elements stereotypically associated with French culture, such as mimes, croissants, baguettes, and rats. It also features attire including berets, striped clothing, and thin mustaches, in response to the simplistic way in which director Jacques Audiard portrayed Mexican culture in Emilia Pérez. (Note: Johanne Sacreblu:)

== See also ==
- List of notable YouTube videos of the 2000s
- List of notable YouTube videos of the 2010s
- List of most-viewed YouTube videos
- List of viral videos
