= The MySpace Movie =

2006 American film

- YouTube thumbnail
- Directed by: David Lehre
- Written by: David Lehre
- Produced by: Reese Serra
- Starring: Jeremy Kerr; Joe Laduke; Rick Joyce; Mike Metz; David Lehre
- Distributed by: Vendetta Studios
- Release date: January 2006
- Running time: 11 minutes
- Country: United States
- Language: English
- Budget: $10,000

The MySpace Movie (also known as MySpace: The Movie) is a 2006 short film and viral video created by David Lehre. Its name refers to Myspace, the social networking website, which it parodies.

Two years later, a new video by Lehre was released, but instead of Myspace, focused on Facebook.

== Plot and outline ==
The MySpace Movie explores the basics of life as well as disputed territories located within the Myspace site in a humorous and parodic fashion. Themes of this movie include:

- Capturing profile images
- Dating on Myspace
- Excessive chain bulletins
- MySpace's "Top 8" feature
- A humorous portrayal of Tom Anderson, the founder of Myspace

=== The blind date ===
This story opens with two males sitting in front of a computer and the first male attempts to show off his prize catch, a woman named Yeta, whose profile they are both examining. His friend believes that the woman has "The Angles", a term referring to the practice of taking photographs from such extreme angles as to obscure or distort the person in question, thus implying that the user is insecure about their image and, presumably, unattractive. He also insists that the woman's name is not Yeta, but Yeti. Shortly afterwards the first male receives a telephone call from the woman in question, whose audible voice bears a close resemblance to that of Chewbacca from Star Wars. They arrange a date for the evening, with the friend insisting upon chaperoning. Once the two meet, the man is horrified to observe that his date is masculine, grunting, and lurching. She immediately rubs up against him, asking "Do you want to see the Angry Beaver?", a now popular quote.

David Lehre (the creator) stars in this chapter.

=== The bulletin ===
This begins with a man reading a bulletin, and having to scroll down excessively. It then reads that if he doesn't repost, he will first hear a duck call, then be killed by a crazy drunken hunter asking for circus peanuts. This is commonly found in many Myspace bulletins today. Finally, during his last moments of life he will see a singing fish. He casually ignores the bulletin as a joke, and is soon thereafter killed precisely as described. The scene takes place in Reese Serra's apartment.

=== The password ===
A prominent feature of Myspace is that of the "Top 8" (Although you may have a "top" of as many as 40), which is essentially the ability to display upon a user's profile page a link to 40 of his chosen friends. In this scene a couple at a computer are arguing; the woman is complaining about her partner's choice of Top 8 friends, expressing dissatisfaction at the fact that she is not among them, as well as questioning the integrity of those present. After demanding his password, she is able to log in and see the rest of his pictures, which include photographs of his participation in lewd activities, including that of judging a wet T-shirt competition. In this scene one can see the address with email ID "joejoe227" and hear the password "biscuits".

=== The party ===
This short segment proposes a humorous theory as to the origin of Myspace creator Tom Anderson's default profile picture - arriving at a college party, where he is immediately the center of attention. (This directly alludes to the fact that whenever a new profile on Myspace is made, Anderson is automatically added as the user's first friend. For this reason, Anderson's profile has over two hundred million friends, and in the movie it is humorously assumed that every one of those people is a close friend of his). Later on, Anderson consumes copious amounts of pizza, alcohol, and even cocaine. A short time later, presumably the morning after, the crowd of Myspace users from the previous evening open the bathroom door while Anderson is vomiting, and take his picture as he hunches over the bowl, resembling Anderson's actual profile picture.

== Production ==
Vendetta Studios, the credited production company, is not classified as an official Motion Picture Production Company on the Internet Movie Database.

Vendetta Studios' work can be found on YouTube. There are, however, two other production companies with similar names: "Vendetta Films" and "Vendetta FX". Vendetta states that it is not in any way associated with Myspace.

David Lehre Productions, like Vendetta Studios, is not an official production company; instead, it is run by a single man.

== Reception ==
The MySpace Movie became an Internet phenomenon almost overnight; more than 10 copies of the movie were produced on YouTube. Reaction has extended beyond the social networking sites and into the mainstream media including mentions in The Boston Globe, San Francisco Chronicle, and The New York Times. The worldwide attention that the video received earned the video's creator, David Lehre, the opportunity to develop a pilot for Fox Television.

== See also ==
- Pastiche
- List of Internet phenomena
- List of most-viewed YouTube videos
