= Chad Future =

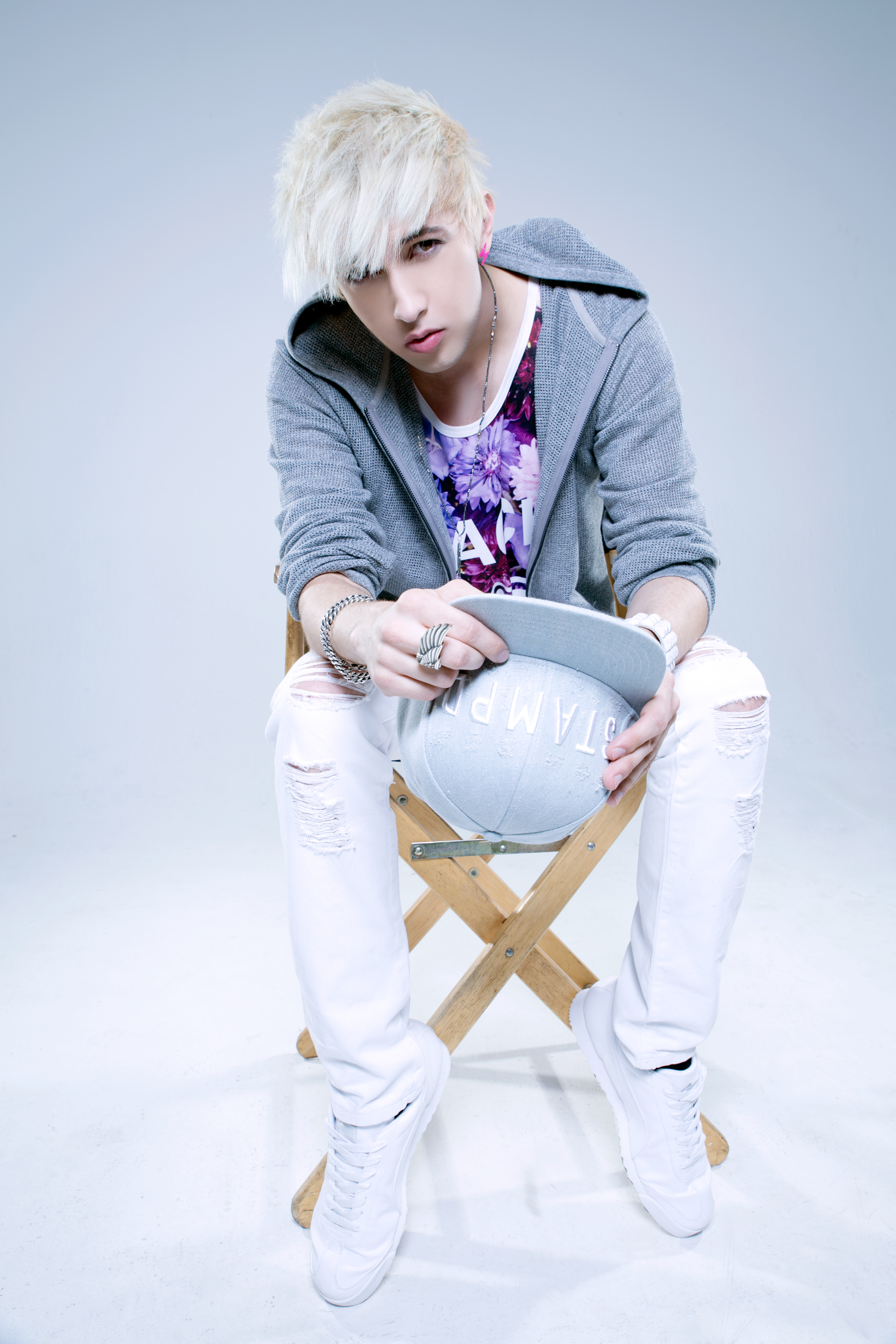
- Chad Future in August 2021

Background information
- Born: David Lehre; August 8, 1988 (age 38)
- Origin: Detroit, Michigan
- Genres: Hip Hop; Pop; K-Pop
- Occupation: Singer
- Instrument: Vocals
- Years active: 2005-present

David Lehre (born August 8, 1988), also known as Chad Future, is an American singer. He is known for directing various films, such as Myspace: The Movie (2006). He has also appeared in several television series and films such as Epic Movie (2007). He has released two studio album EPs in English and Korean, featuring well-known K-Pop artists such as Ha Sung-woon, Aron, and Ravi.

== Early life ==
Lehre grew up in the neighborhood of Washington, Michigan in the Metro Detroit area, with Italian heritage.

Lehre credits his high school theatre classes as the catalyst for starting his career. He began making films after he and his friends were denied parts in their high school production of Little Women.

== Career ==
=== Acting and filmmaking ===
On January 28, 2006, Lehre uploaded Myspace: The Movie, a parody of the popular social networking site that he directed, co-wrote, edited, scored, and starred in. Three days after Lehre uploaded the video to his personal site, another user uploaded the video to YouTube. By February 2006, Myspace: The Movie became YouTube's most viewed video at 3.4 million views. The film movie also began airing on rotation on Current TV, which reached 20 million U.S. homes.

In 2007, Lehre appeared in the film Epic Movie.

In 2009, Lehre starred as Shamus Bryce in the sci-fi short Turbo, alongside Justin Chon. Lehre appeared in several films, commercials, and music videos.

In 2011, Lehre also worked as an interviewer for MTV’s coverage of Billboard Korea’s KPOP Masters event.

In 2021, Lehre’s short film The Newscaster was featured in the My RØDE Reel short film competition.

=== Music ===
==== Heart2Heart ====
In 2011, Lehre, performing under the name Chad Future, formed the 5-member musical group Heart2Heart. The group was heavily influenced by the K-Pop boy band structure, with an assigned leader and each member fulfilling a specific role. It and consisted of members Chad Future, Pretty Boi Pete, KX, Nico, and Brayden.

Former N*SYNC member Lance Bass mentored the group and made a cameo in their debut music video. Lehre became friends with Bass while hosting the American Music Awards red carpet pre-show together in 2010.

The music video for Heart2Heart's debut single "Facebook Official" was directed by Lehre.

==== Chad Future ====
Inspired by his interest in K-Pop and American pop music, Lehre officially announced his solo music project under the stage name Chad Future in 2012, with a goal to bridge the gap between the genres. He chose the stage name Chad Future because he was nicknamed Chad while doing character work in high school theater.

Chad Future began creating English covers of popular K-pop songs by artists such as EXO, BigBang, and B.A.P., which received attention from fans and some of the actual artists.

Chad Future's English remix of BigBang's "Loser", which also featured American recording artist Preston Knight, was chosen as the winner of YG Entertainment's Made Series M cover competition.

Chad Future performed at the first KCON in 2012, and made his official debut on M-Net's M Countdown in Los Angeles on August 25, 2013.

He released The First Mini Album in 2014, a 5-song EP which featured collaborations with K-Pop recording artists VIXX's Ravi and NU'EST's Aron.

Chad Future's first television special "I Am Chad Future" aired on Mnet America in 2014, which documented the creation of his first album and the preparation of his M Countdown performance. In addition to being the title star, he also produced and edited the special.

In 2015, exactly one year after releasing his first mini album, Future, Lehre released his 2nd mini album, titled AK-Pop, which included 5 songs and collaborations with artists such as Ha Sung-woon and Bestie's U.JI. Both American and Korean artists, including Shin Hyuk, participated in its production.

In 2016, he directed, executive produced, and starred in Chad Future TV, which premiered on The Audience Network channel as a documentary series, also airing on AT&T U-Verse, DirecTV, and Fullscreen. Chad Future TV followed his first journey to Seoul, South Korea, where he collaborated with and interviewed K-Pop artists and went on several cultural adventures around the country.

In 2022, Chad released original songs "Summer with You" and covers of popular songs by K-Pop artists BTS, Aespa, and Stray Kids.

In 2023, he released "Good Vibes" with Korean singer-song writer Kyung Dasom on NHN Bugs Label.

== Filmography ==
=== Short films ===
Year	Title	Director	Writer	Producer	Notes	Ref.
2006	Myspace: The Movie	check	check	check		
2008	Facebook: The Movie	check	check	check		
2012	Perfect Harmony	check			Coca-Cola promotion aired on American Idol	
2014	I Am Chad Future	check		check		

=== Television ===
Year	Title	Director	Writer	Producer	Ref.
2008	Vendetta Revolution	check	check		
2011	MTV's The Seven	check	check	check	
2016	Chad Future TV	check		check	

=== Acting roles ===
Year	Title	Role	Notes
2006	Myspace: The Movie	Dave	Also director, writer, and producer
2006	20/20	Himself	On December 26, 2009 episode
2007	Epic Movie	Ashton Kutcher	
2008	Vendetta Revolution	Various Characters	Also creator, director, and head writer
2008	Jimmy Kimmel Live!	Himself	On January 24, 2008 episode
2008	Facebook: The Movie	Cody	Also director, writer, and producer
2009	Third Shift	Raven	Short film
2009	Dragon Slayerz	Evan	Short film
2009	Turbo	Shamus Bryce	Short film
2010	American Music Awards	Himself/Red Carpet Host	Red carpet streaming host for AMAs
2011	American Music Awards	Himself/Red Carpet Host	
2011	MTV's The Seven	Various Characters	Also director, writer, and producer
2014	I Am Chad Future	Chad Future	Mnet America Special
2016	Chad Future TV	Chad Future	Also director, producer, and editor

== Discography ==
=== Extended plays ===
Title	Released	Label	Format
The First Mini Album	June 30, 2014	Vendetta Studios	CD, Digital Download, Streaming
The 2nd Mini Album ‘AK-Pop'	June 30, 2015	Vendetta Studios	CD, Digital Download, Streaming
