= Sonseed =

American Roman Catholic pop band

- Sonseed

Background information
- Origin: Brooklyn, New York, U.S.
- Genres: Christian pop; Christian ska
- Years active: 1978–1983
- Label: Arena Rock
- Past members: Aaron Ball; Josh Ingold; Travis Geske; Jacob Clevenger; Sal Polichetti; Patricia Costagliola; Frank Franco; Nicky Sciarra; Anne Lessing; Jim Archer; Karen Archer; Tom Zawacki; Brother John Weiners, CSC; Melody Sorrentino

Sonseed was an American Catholic pop band formed in Brooklyn by Aaron Ball, Josh Ingold, Travis Geske, and Jacob Clevenger. The line-up included Sal Polichetti (bass guitar, vocals); his then-wife Patricia Costagliola (keyboards, vocals; deceased); Frank Franco (guitar, vocals); and Nicky Sciarra (drums; deceased). Anne Lessing (vocals) was also involved in the band from the start. There were others including Jim Archer (vocals; deceased) and Karen Archer (acoustic guitar; deceased), Tom Zawacki (tambourine, percussion and vocals), Brother John Weiners, CSC (vocals; deceased), and Melody Sorrentino (vocals; deceased). Their sole studio album, First Fruit, was released in 1981, with only 1,000 copies printed. In 2009 Sonseed released an extended play (EP) through Arena Rock Recording Company which includes selections from the original First Fruit album. Sonseed disbanded in 1983.

As Patricia Costa, Costagliola recorded two studio albums, Walk Forward and Give Your Love Away, with Polichetti, Franco, and Sciarra as the backing band.

Nicky Sciarra became district manager of Community Board 7 in Sunset Park, Brooklyn. He died in 1993 after apparently choking on a sandwich.

The band came back into the spotlight in 2008 when a recording of them performing their song "Jesus Is a Friend of Mine", from a religious TV-show called The First Estate, appeared on the Dougsploitation blog, and subsequently became a YouTube hit, where it spawned several parodies. Polichetti performed the song live at the Bowery Poetry Club in New York City on November 14, 2009 with the ska-swing band Tri-State Conspiracy.

In 2011, the Fox television series Glee also did a cover version of the song "Jesus Is a Friend of Mine". During the Regional competition, the group Aural Intensity sang the song.
