= Wario Land: Shake It – Amazing Footage! =

2008 video game advertisement

- Screenshot of the YouTube ad
- Agency: Goodby, Silverstein & Partners
- Client: Nintendo
- Language: English
- Media: YouTube
- Product: Wario Land: Shake It!
- Release date: 2008
- Written by: Nat Lawlor
- Directed by: Jeff Goodby; Rich Silverstein; Bryan Houlette; Erik Enberg
- Production company: Mike Kellogg
- Produced by: Jennifer Wilson
- Country: United States

Wario Land: Shake It – Amazing Footage! is a YouTube advertisement for the 2008 Wii video game Wario Land: Shake It! in which the protagonist Wario does various large-impact actions and collecting items, causing the surrounding YouTube webpage to be destroyed bit by bit while these items accumulate around the page. The video was directed by staff from the marketing company Goodby, Silverstein & Partners and produced by Jennifer Wilson of the production company Mike Kellogg. It was eventually taken down and replaced by a documentary-style advertisement for the 2009 Wii game Punch-Out!!, created by the same production company. It inspired the creation of a script that was used on Niconico to cause a similar effect to happen.

The video advertisement was considered successful among YouTube users, video game journalists, and marketing professionals, earning four million views in its first month and exceeding awareness expectations. The advertisement received multiple awards and recognition, particularly for having inspired future advertisements by other companies.

== Video ==
The YouTube advertisement features gameplay of the video game Wario Land: Shake It! (Note: Known as Wario Land: The Shake Dimension in Australia and Europe) showing Wario going through various parts of the game. As various impacts occur in the video, the surrounding elements (such as recommended videos, video descriptions, and YouTube functions) begin to degrade and fall apart. Coins and other objects also come out of the video frame and spread across the webpage. The video ends with the game's logo crashing on top of the YouTube video, causing it to fall into a pile of page elements. Viewers could pick up elements that fell around the page with their cursor, dragging and dropping them. Certain elements can still be interacted with, such as the "share" and "favorite" buttons. The video page will return to normal upon being refreshed.

== History ==
The trailer was released in 2008, and was an "interactive first" for YouTube. Its creative directors were Jeff Goodby and Rich Silverstein of marketing company Goodby, Silverstein & Partners. Its art direction was handled by Bryan Houlette, whose assistant art director was Erik Enberg. It was produced by the production company Mike Kellogg; its producer was Jennifer Wilson and its copywriter was Nat Lawlor. The video was created for YouTube in part because of the perception that YouTube was where kids may go to look into video games. The destruction of the surrounding page was done with this game because it reflected Wario's destructive nature. YouTube was initially skeptical about an ad that destroyed their website. YouTube changed its mind eventually due to its apparent creative and marketing merit. The campaign was created to appeal to teenagers and had a budget of $80,000. The video was one part of the marketing campaign for the game, which also included a competition at Six Flags and a gasoline giveaway. The ad was removed from YouTube upon the release of a documentary-style YouTube ad for Punch-Out!! for the Wii, created by the same marketing team.

== Reception ==
The YouTube ad campaign was well-received by marketing professionals and gaming blogs. It was awarded silver in the 88th edition of The Art Directors Annual, and won gold and bronze in the Viral and Rich Media Advertising categories, respectively, at the 2009 Clio Awards, where it was also shortlisted for Animation. It was successful with the teenage demographic it aimed for, achieving 24 percent awareness despite an initial goal of 12–15 percent. The ad received a lot of attention, accumulating four million views in its first month. It was the first ad of its kind, leading to similar ads in the following months. A YouTube representative told the team behind the ad that it caused them to receive a number of calls from advertisers questioning why this function was not made available to them. Authors Damian Ryan and Calvin Jones believed that the success of the ad reflected that Internet users actively avoided "run-of-the-mill" ads, stating that marketers needed to create engaging, creative ads like this ad to draw attention. Despite this positive reception, the ad failed to push the sales of the game to hit the pre-goal number of 350,000 units by the end of 2008, which the campaign team attributed to the Great Recession and low game sales across the board.

The video has received positive reception from video game writers as well. Kotaku writer Mike Fahey called the ad "genius", finding it more interesting than the accompanying free gasoline campaign. Destructoid writer Colette Burnett felt that it would be memorable for its viewers. Burnett, along with Wired writer Chris Kohler and Joystiq writer Ross Miller, found it to be a clever ad, with the latter calling it a "fun surprise". CNET writer Josh Lowensohn considered the marketing campaign a memorable one, calling it "mind-bogglingly cool". Following its removal, a Kombo writer expressed sadness that the only way it would be seen is through non-interactive YouTube videos, calling it Nintendo's best advertisement ever. They hoped that someone would be able to clone the page.

A Niconico user utilized an exploit in the Flash compatibility of the website using a script that connects Flash to JavaScript to destroy the HTML once the user hits a button that warns the viewer to never touch. The script was created after being inspired by the Wario Land: Shake It! ad.
