= Disgusting Domino's People =

2009 YouTube video

From the video: a Domino's employee sticks cheese up his nose before putting it on food the narrator states will go out to customers.

"Disgusting Domino's People" is a series of five viral videos uploaded to YouTube on April 13, 2009, which depict a male employee at a Domino's Pizza restaurant, Michael Setzer, contaminating ingredients with his nostrils and buttocks while a co-worker, Kristy Hammonds, narrates that items with those ingredients will go out to customers. The Consumerist blog was the first to post about the videos a day later, with readers using an exterior shot and Google Earth to identify the location as a Domino's in Conover, North Carolina, and contacting both the restaurant owner and Domino's.

Within only days of the upload, the videos garnered more than a million views and international press, got the two employees fired and charged with a felony for food contamination, and negatively affected the consumer reputation of the Domino's brand. On April 15, 2009, Domino's published apologies on its website and in online video form with a recording from president Patrick Doyle. In 2010, Setzer and Hammonds pleaded guilty to lesser punishment, facing short prison sentences, several months of probation, and prohibition from being at Domino's and other places that serve food or beverages. News outlets cited the scandal as an example of how strongly and quickly the internet and social media can ruin the reputation of major brands.

== Background ==
Franchises facing business repercussions for crimes that only take place at one of its chains have existed before; one notable example in the early 1990s was a robbery killing of seven employees at a Brown's Chicken & Pasta in Palatine, Illinois, which caused a 30-to-40-percent drop in sales that led to the closure of several chains. Sources such as ABC News and The New York Times covered the 2009 Domino's crisis as an example of how the internet and social media has made public relations for corporations difficult, where a crisis can occur out of a small incident and a company cannot "ignore customers and hope problems disappear." Examples happening around this time include Amazon having to make a public statement after being accused of removing best-sellers with LGBT themes off their platform, Motrin pulling an advertisement due to social media backlash, and Tropicana stopping the sale of redesigned containers after a storm of complaints. When it comes to corporations facing a bad internet reputation due to the actions of one of its local employees, this was the case for Burger King in August 2008 when a video of an employee bathing in a kitchen sink of a chain in Xenia, Ohio went viral.

According to a Charlotte food industry expert interviewed by WCNC-TV in 2009, cases of food contamination in the town and its surrounding areas were non-existent in her 24-year career. Conover councilman Lee Moritz Jr stated that the Domino's chain had a good relationship with the community through its support towards youth groups and major events. Before the videos, the restaurant had an "A" score of 96.5 from the local Health Department.

== Videos ==
The five YouTube videos, named Disgusting Domino's People, feature two young Domino's employees, Kristy and Michael, in which the latter puts salami near his buttocks, cheese up his nose before he places them on sandwiches he spits on, and Kristy announces, "in about five minutes these will be sent out and somebody will be eating these -- yes, eating these. And little do they know that the cheese was in his nose and that there was some lethal gas that ended up on their salami. Now that's how we roll at Domino's." One video depicts Michael rubbing a sponge on his backside before wiping a pan with it.

== Publicity ==
A YouTube channel named Whiteair2 uploaded Kristy and Michael's videos on April 12, 2009. The Consumerist blog was the first publication to post about them a day later with the following text: "Here are three clips of Kristy and Michael, a couple of not-that-bright idiots getting themselves fired, and quite possible sued, by doing unsanitary things to customers' orders on camera while their manager sits in the back reading the newspaper. "Whiteair2" posted them to YouTube in the last day, and now everyone knows that Michael likes to put cheese and peppers up his nose." Within less than 24 hours of upload, the video had 21,000 views, which went up to 760,000 views 24 more hours later before reaching more than a million Wednesday afternoon.

Domino's spokesperson Tim McIntyre was first informed of the videos via an email from Jeremy Hooper, founder of one of the blogs that spread them, GoodAsYou.org. The marketing team, around thirty minutes later, contacted YouTube to take the video down, but the site couldn't do it without permission from the uploader. Only a few hours later, two Consumerist readers, Amy Wilson, a Georgetown University student, and boyfriend Jonathan Drake, noticed a Jack in the Box in an exterior shot of one of the videos, and searched through Domino's chains next to Jack in the Box restaurants via the satellite feature of Google Earth; Paris Miller from Northern Kentucky then traced one of Hammonds' friends to Conover, an area that had a Domino's and Jack in the Box close to each other. The readers emailed both the local chain manager and the national corporation.

Although the video was taken down on April 15 due to a copyright claim by Hammonds, they remained known through third-party re-uploads that garnered more than 2 million views by May 3, 2009. On the April 17, 2009 edition of The Guardian's Viral Video Chart, the video landed at number four.

Less than a day after the videos were uploaded, Domino's spokesperson Tim McIntyre was interviewed by Ad Age revealing that the employees in the video would be fired: "Any idiot with a webcam and an internet connection can attempt to undo all that's right about the brand [...] In the course of one three-minute video, two idiots can attempt to unravel all of that." He also revealed an email from Kristy regarding the video: "It was all a prank and me nor Michael expected to have this much attention from the videos that were uploaded! No food was ever sent out to any customer. We would never put something like that on YouTube if it were real!! It was fake and I wish that everyone knew that!!!!" The Conover restaurant closed for a day of clean-up on April 14 before reopening the next afternoon.

The videos garnered coverage from publications worldwide, such as The Daily Telegraph. Gary Lafone, the chief of police that charged the two employees, admitted to avoiding interview calls from BBC, Inside Edition, Court TV and far-away stations about the fiasco. A local paper close to Conover, Hickory Daily Record, garnered a response letter from a reader from Nevada outraged at the employees.

In an interview with ABC News published on May 4, Hammonds admitted that in her community, she had difficulty finding work at another fast food and was an outcast. Hammonds' mother responded to local news outlets, keeping her identity hidden; she stated that her daughter felt "Very remorseful. Stupid. Embarrassed," and "I feel very bad for the company of course, because I know there's going to be a lot of people who aren't going to want to eat there." Michael Setzer's brother, Chase, was also interviewed by the local news, stating Michael felt awful and was worried about his co-workers losing their jobs: "He regrets even doing it. It wasn't supposed to make it to YouTube, but the girl put it on YouTube and that's when everything went haywire. [...] They threw it away is what he's been telling me. He's been real upset about it. I told him, 'You shouldn't have done it.' He's like, 'I know I shouldn't have done it, but you know I'm stupid,'."

== Legal action ==
On April 15, the two employees turned themselves in following a felony warrant filed by police and were charged with food contamination which made them plausible for a jail sentence of four months to a year. They were held at Catawba County Jail under a $7,500 bond, with Setzer released the same day he was arrested. The two first appeared at District Court on April 17 with Gary Dellinger as judge; attorneys assigned were Wes Barkley for Hammonds and Shawn Clark for Setzer. Although Hammonds and Clark claimed the food in the video never went out, this contradicted what prosecutors say Setzer told police that customers did receive items with the contaminated ingredients. The police's investigation was done with the help of the Catawba County Health Department.

Setzer entered an Alford plea on March 9, 2010, and was sentenced to six months in jail and requiring to be on supervised probation for two years, pay a $1,000 court fee, and stay away from Hammonds and any Domino's restaurant. Stated Clark, "[Setzer] admits it was a childish, immature, stupid, stupid thing to do. He says while the food was never sent out, it was probably a bad idea to make a video of it." On November 19, 2010, Hammonds pled guilty in exchange for a reduced 45-day suspended sentence, 18 months probation, 200 community service hours, attorney fees of $1,125, and prohibition from working at any place selling food or drinks; she also was required to submit videos of the incident to police and not talk about anything related to the case publicly. The judge sentencing her, Richard Boner, said during the court sessions, "The scary thing is, this goes on in other places that you don't know about, and it makes you wonder what you're getting."

McIntyre, upon the videos' popularity, stated the U.S. Food and Drug Administration was investigating for federal charges and that Domino's was considering a civil action suit for brand defamation; however, none of the employees have been reported to face these charges.

== Effect on Domino's ==
The average daily number of blog posts mentioning Domino's from March to April 2009 was 27.4 per day; by April 15, that rose to 227.5. According to publication perception measurer BrandIndex, Domino's buzz rating went from 22.5 points on April 10 to 13.6 on April 14, and their quality rating decreased from 5 to -2.8 within a day. Zeta Interactive also reported consumer perception being 64% negative, where the month prior it was around 81% positive. Perception from those surveyed by YouGov also soured, with the company's global managing director Ted Marzilli stating that 15-to-20 of the participants mentioned the controversial videos. Upon the videos' initial exposure, The New York Times reported five out of twelve results on the first page of a Google search for "Domino's" being about them.

Domino's was initially skeptical to make a press statement out of fear of garnering the video more attention, and ordered McIntyre to directly respond to blogs covering the video instead. However, the negative attention only escalated. On April 15, Domino's released a statement on their official website, apologizing for the video and thanking the brand's customers: "The opportunities and freedom of the internet is wonderful. But it also comes with the risk of anyone with a camera and an internet link to cause a lot of damage, as in this case, where a couple of individuals suddenly overshadow the hard work performed by the 125,000 men and women working for Domino's across the nation and in 60 countries around the world." That same day, it also uploaded a video message from Domino's USA president Patrick Doyle, which announced the Conover location was shut down and being cleaned: "We sincerely apologize for this incident. We thank members of the online community who quickly alerted us and allowed us to take immediate action. Although the individuals in question claim it's a hoax, we are taking this incredibly seriously." The brand also launched its official Twitter account that day with the handle dpzinfo. Rick Ridgway, who led 100 Domino's chains of the area that included the Conover chain, stated to the Hickory Daily Record, "This is not indicative of people who work for Domino's. These were the rogue actions of two ex-employees."

Within a week of the video's upload, sales at Domino's chains in the area that included Conover fell by 50%, resulting in 600 employees losing their jobs. Mack Patterson, owner of the restaurants, claimed feeling "sick," "disgusted," and "angry," publishing an ad in an edition of the Charlotte Observer released on April 17, 2009: "To our valued customers and friends, recently, an unflattering video was circulated on the Internet by two former employees from another franchise -- from a store I do not own. They greatly impacted our business and affected more than 600 employees and their families." On April 18, the Hickory Daily Record reported the Conover restaurant being supported by the local community, including from Rudy Wright, small business owner and mayor of a town close to Conover named Hickory, who bought three pizzas from it. On September 22, 2009, the Conover location of the video was closed shortly resulting in the loss of jobs for 20 workers. McIntyre responded to the closing: "You've got an innocent business owner who lost his livelihood and there are 20 fellow employees who lost their jobs because these two people thought they were being funny, and it's tragic."

== Commentary ==
Mark Wnek, a chairman-chief creative officer of Lowe New York, called the behavior in the video a "crime against working people," noting that it would have a negative psychological impact on workers and parents who can only afford fast food during a difficult economic time. In fact, CNET's Chris Matyszczyk attributed many American citizens' reliance on fast food as a major reason for the negative attention: "People are relying far more on fast food to get through their budgetary week and are desperate, despite stories to the contrary, to know that these restaurants are sanitary." As Marzilli reasoned how consumer perception decreased due to one video, "It's graphic enough in the video, and it's created enough of a stir, that it gives people a little bit of pause."

On the week of the scandal, brand experts praised Domino's quick response, but felt it could've been sooner and debated the corporation's long-term ability to survive. Some predicted that the nationwide hatred online towards Domino's would be short-lived, and recommended the corporation do special offers and price discounts to get back positive consumer perception. On the other hand, Tait Subler founding partner Dodie Subler was skeptical due to the clips' online long-term existence. Nielsen Online brand strategist Pete Blackshaw recommended the corporation stop airing television advertisements for a few weeks to get the incident out of the people's conscience.

Wrote Henry Blodget, it was "hard to know what companies should do about this other recognize that it's going to happen (with thousands of employees and customers, a few are always going to be disgruntled and/or stupid). Companies just need to learn to deal with it as fast and well as they can."

== See also ==
- Burger King foot lettuce
- Seriously McDonalds
