= Speaking Moistly =

Single by Anonymotif
- Released: 8 April 2020
- Genre: Synth-pop, remix
- Length: 1:46
- Composer: Brock Tyler
- Lyricist: Justin Trudeau

Anonymotif singles chronology
"Speaking Moistly" (2020)	"Bunch of Yahoos (Queen's Park)" (2020)

Audio sample
- "Speaking Moistly": file; help

Music video
- "Speaking Moistly" on YouTube

"Speaking Moistly" is a remix song of Canadian prime minister Justin Trudeau's voice edited by Brock Tyler, known on YouTube as anonymotif. It is based on Trudeau's words from a press conference regarding the COVID-19 pandemic in Canada. The quote "speaking moistly" refers to respiratory droplets that are spit out when one speaks, which can potentially spread COVID-19.

== Original speech ==
In the speech on 7 April 2020, Trudeau stated that he was not a medical expert. He encouraged Canadians to avoid going out, practice social distancing by staying two metres apart, wash their hands and cough into their elbows to prevent spreading COVID-19. He further clarified, based on advice from chief public health officer Theresa Tam, "If people want to wear a mask, that is okay. It protects others more than it protects you, because it prevents you from breathing or... or... speaking, uh... 'moistly' on them." (This was apparently a reference to breathing, coughing, speaking and all other actions that might convey contagion to another person through moisture). He appeared to immediately regret his choice of words, following immediately with, "Ugh, what a terrible image."

Opposition leader Andrew Scheer also used the phrase "speaking moistly", referencing Trudeau's speech, in a news conference on 14 April 2020.

== Reception ==
Brock Tyler, an Edmonton musician, auto-tuned clips of the speech to a 1980s-style synth-pop instrumental he composed and uploaded a music video to YouTube on 8 April 2020. Within 24 hours, the song had gone viral and been watched over a million times on YouTube. Reception to the song was positive. Daily Hive stated the remix was an "unbelievably epic song." iHeartRadio called it "the next chart topping hit." CBC News wrote "The '80s style synth tune has a catchy beat but the lyrics and chorus about "speaking moistly" might make people cover their ears as well as their faces." Narcity called the song "hilarious". The Loop called the song "an epic gift from the internet gods." Exclaim! wrote the song is a "club banger" and "a hit."

Trudeau himself praised the song on Twitter, saying, "Thanks for the laugh... it’s my new hand-washing song."

== Covers ==
The song was covered by Toronto ska band the Classy Wrecks. The band's guitarist and vocalist, Daniel Mager, told Narcity, "When I had heard the original version of "Speaking Moistly", it was instantly stuck in my head and thought that it needed to be a part of our Socially Acceptable Distancing Sessions. I think that we as Canadians have the responsibility to try our best to stay at home when possible, "Speaking Moistly" really helps relay this information in an entertaining way."

The song was also covered by Ottawa heavy metal band Infrared. The lead singer of Infrared told Brave Words, "We just couldn't stop laughing. He actually used Justin Trudeau to sing the song, which we thought was super funny. We thought the tune was so catchy we were just like, wouldn't this be awesome?"

Acoustic versions of the song have been uploaded to YouTube, including by singer Andrew Phelan. HuffPost wrote Phelan "turned the track into an upbeat, guitar-lick driven bop that actually sort of slaps."

On 1 July 2020 (Canada Day), David Usher from the Canadian alt-rock band Moist and Toronto-based Odin Quartet released their version of "Speaking Moistly" on YouTube.

== Track listing ==
Digital download

1. "Speaking Moistly" – 1:46

== See also ==
- Get on the Beers, a similar remix of a quote by Australian state premier Dan Andrews
