= List of viral videos =

This is a partial list of viral videos, including those that are music videos, that have gained rapid attention on the Internet. Like Internet memes, viewership of such videos tend to grow rapidly and become more widespread because of instant communication facilitates and word of mouth.

This list documents videos known to have become viral; additional videos that have become Internet phenomena for other categories can be found at list of Internet phenomena.

== General videos ==
- 2 Girls 1 Cup – A video of two girls engaging in coprophilia. This video has also originated a series of amateur videos showing the reactions of people seeing the original video.
- 2 Hours Doing Nothing – Video of Indonesian YouTuber Muhammad Didit staring in his camera and doing nothing for two hours, published on 10 July 2020. It achieved 1.7 million views on the day of release, and 3 million in one month. After receiving positive comments by the media and politician Sandiaga Uno, it was later adapted to a mobile game.
- 300-page iPhone bill – A 300-page iPhone bill from AT&T Mobility mailed in a box was the subject of a viral video made by YouTube personality Justine Ezarik, best known as iJustine, which became an Internet meme in August 2007. Ezarik's video focused on the unnecessary waste of paper, as the detailed bill itemized all data transfers made during the billing period, including every email and text message. Stories of unexpected billing issues began to circulate in blogs and the technical press after the Apple iPhone's heavily advertised and anticipated release, but this video clip brought the voluminous bills to the attention of the mass media. Ten days later, after the video had been viewed more than 3 million times on the Internet and had received international news coverage, AT&T sent iPhone users a text message outlining changes in its billing practices. The information technology magazine Computerworld included this incident in its list of "Technology's 10 Most Mortifying Moments".
- 11B-X-1371 – An unsettling video filmed in an abandoned Polish sanatorium, in which someone wearing a plague doctor costume gesticulates toward coded messages making threats against the U.S. President. Further less specific threats and disturbing images were found hidden in the spectrogram of the video's soundtrack.
- 2007 Miss Teen USA Pageant – A video of Caitlin Upton's response to a question at the Miss Teen USA 2007 received over 3.5 million views on YouTube in three days.
- Ain't Nobody Got Time for That – A news interview with Kimberly "Sweet Brown" Wilkins, of Oklahoma City, in April 2012. Wilkins was asked about her escape from her burning apartment complex; she concluded the conversation by remarking "I got bronchitis! Ain't nobody got time for that!" The phrase has been reprinted on various forms of merchandise, while Wilkins appeared on television programs. Jimmy Kimmel later made a parody starring Queen Latifah as Wilkins inspiring people across history with phrases from the video. Wilkins herself appears in a cameo.
- Angry German Kid – A video of a German teenager trying to play Unreal Tournament on his PC, but he faces problems with it which causes him to get enraged and shout, as well as smashing his keyboard in some scenes.
- Arrest of Vladimir Putin – The mock video shows Russian President (then Prime Minister) Vladimir Putin facing a courtroom trial. The footage was taken from the real-life trial of Mikhail Khodorkovsky and then digitally altered to make a faux news report. As of November 2024, the viral video has over 13 million views.
- Asians in the Library – A racist rant by Alexandra Wallace, an undergraduate student at the University of California, Los Angeles, in March 2011.
- Baby saying the N word – Far-right, white influencers Isabella and Josiah Moody posted a video on X/Twitter showing their baby babbling something that sounded like the word nigger. The video received nearly 6 million views while it was online, and Isabella captioned it "My daughter literally said the n-word...I'm so proud of her!" Josiah suggested that teaching a baby to say the slur was a way to get "insane Twitter growth". However, the backlash from other commenters was severe, and eventually both Moodys deleted their accounts.
- Bill O'Reilly Freaks Out – An outtake from Bill O'Reilly's tenure on Inside Edition, which depicted O'Reilly cursing at his co-workers while having issues with the closing lines on his teleprompter. After the video went viral in May 2008, O'Reilly acknowledged the video's existence, claiming that he was amusing his co-workers and said "I have plenty of much newer stuff...If you want to buy the tapes that I have, I'm happy to sell them to you." The rant was later parodied by Stephen Colbert on The Colbert Report as well as Family Guy and by Trevor Noah on The Daily Show, and was named one of Time's "Top 10 Celebrity Meltdowns".
- Bitchy Resting Face – a parody comedy public service announcement video by the Funny Or Die comedy team that has since gone on to become a popular internet meme, and to become more commonly known as resting bitch face (RBF).
- Boom goes the dynamite – Brian Collins, a nervous sports anchor, fumbles highlights, concluding with this infamous catchphrase. It's become commonly used in many things, including an episode of Family Guy and being quoted by Will Smith when he flubbed a line on stage during the 81st Academy Awards telecast. As of March 2009, Collins was a reporter for KXXV, a television station in Waco, Texas.
- Bitconnect – A keynote speech by Carlos Matos. The video features Matos screaming "Bitconnect" and "I Love Bitconnect". Due to the nature of the speech and Matos consistently promoting a fraud, the speech has been remixed and edited by various people.
- Bus Uncle – A recording of a verbal altercation aboard a Hong Kong bus, where a middle-aged man berates a younger passenger for interrupting his phone call after the younger man had asked him to keep his voice down during his call. The video became the second-most viewed video of May 2006 on YouTube and inspired several spoofs such as a karaoke version and a rap song.
- Charlie Bit My Finger – A YouTube video featuring two young brothers from England, where the younger brother bites the finger of the older brother, hence the title of the video.
- Chewbacca Mask Lady – A video of an enthusiastic woman, named Candace Payne, wearing a Chewbacca mask. Posted on 19 May 2016, it has become the most-viewed Facebook Live video of all time with over 140 million views.
- Chopped Chin – A 2023 clip of former WNBA player Renee Montgomery and her adopted son Angel Wiley (who came to be known as "Chopped Chin" from the video) dancing in their seats at a Atlanta Dream game went viral in January 2025 on Instagram and TikTok. It is considered to be the first meme of 2025.
- The Crazy Nastyass Honey Badger – A YouTube video posted by the user Randall in 2011 featuring a comedic narration dubbed over pre-existing National Geographic footage.
- Damn Daniel – A series of Snapchat videos depicting Joshua Holz complementing his friend Daniel Lara's Vans. In 2016, Time magazine listed Lara as one of "The 30 Most Influential People on the Internet".
- David After Dentist – A video of 7-year old David DeVore Jr's reaction to anesthesia.
- Dancing Matt – Video game designer Matt Harding filmed himself in 2003, dancing in front of various world landmarks. Eventually, a chewing gum company sent him off to dance on seven continents, and by October 2006 the video had over 5 million views. Harding compiled two similar videos in 2008 and 2012.
- Democracy Manifest – An October 1991 news segment of Jack Karlson being arrested outside a Chinese restaurant in Brisbane for using a stolen credit card. While being arrested, Karlson makes various remarks such as referring to his situation as "democracy manifest" and asking if he's being charged for eating "a succulent Chinese meal". The news segment was uploaded in 2009 and became viral. Karlson died in 2024, with a documentary about him set to be released the following year.
- Diet Coke and Mentos – Geysers of carbonated drink mixed with Mentos.
- Double Rainbow – a video posted to YouTube by Paul Vasquez of him filming a double rainbow at Yosemite National Park. Vasquez's amazed and overwhelmed response includes philosophical questions about the rainbows, such as "what do they mean?" Subsequently, the video went viral, and an auto-tuned remix named the "Double Rainbow Song" using the video's audio track was later released by the Gregory Brothers, receiving more than 30 million views and becoming another meme.
- Dramatic Chipmunk – A video featuring a prairie dog (almost always inaccurately called a chipmunk) turning its head suddenly toward the camera, with a zoom-in on its face while suspenseful music plays.
- Drinking Out of Cups – A video of Dan Deacon's 2003 spoken-word song of the same name. The video features an anthropomorphized lizard describing various scenes in an exaggerated Long Island accent.
- Edgar's fall – A video in which a Mexican boy tries to cross a stream using a branch, which gets lifted by his cousin causing him to fall into the stream.
- Egg Crack Challenge – A TikTok trend that gained attention in 2023 in which parents filmed themselves cracking eggs on their children's foreheads while appearing to cook or bake with them. The trend drew criticism from child-development experts over questions of consent and trust.
- eHarmony Video Bio – Video of a woman calling herself "Debbie" in an online dating video who ends up getting very emotional over her affection for cats. The staged video was uploaded to the YouTube channel of Cara Hartmann, a resident of Lower Merion Township, Pennsylvania. In 2013, she was featured in a Volkswagen commercial for the Super Bowl XLVII.
- Epic Beard Man – Video of a bus fight in Oakland, California in which 67-year-old Thomas Bruso physically defends himself against an African-American man after being accused of racial prejudice then punched by him.
- Evolution of Dance – A video of a six-minute live performance of motivational speaker Judson Laipply's routine consisting of several recognizable dance movies to respective songs. The video was one of the earliest examples of a viral video posted on YouTube, having received 23 million hits within 2 weeks of posting in mid-2006, and was marked as an example of low budget, user-generated content achieving broadcast television-sized audiences.
- Ela Giorgi – A video of a 2008 traffic accident which gained popularity on YouTube and Greek social media in 2019.
- Everyday – An art project by American photographer Noah Kalina in which Kalina takes a photograph of himself every day and then compiles the photographs into a timelapse. Kalina started the project in 2000 when he was 19 and the first video was uploaded in 2006. The second and third videos in the art project were uploaded in 2012 and 2020 respectively.
- From the Doctor to My Son Thomas – A recording of Scottish actor and director Peter Capaldi, in-character as the Twelfth Doctor, to Thomas Goodall, an autistic nine-year-old English boy, consoling him over the death of his grandmother.
- Gallon smashing – The act of smashing a gallon of liquid in a manner that appears to be accidental. The prank often involves throwing a gallon of milk onto a grocery store aisle, then falling and sometimes having difficulty returning to a standing position.
- George Bush Doesn't Care About Black People – During a 2005 benefits concert to support those affected by Hurricane Katrina, American rapper Kanye West, presenting alongside Canadian actor Mike Myers, proceeded to go off-script to criticize the media's portrayal of Black families during the storm's aftermath and accusing U.S. soldiers of being ordered to shoot at Black residents. After Myers speaks, West remarks that, "George Bush doesn't care about black people".
- Golden Eagle Snatches Kid – A video filmed at a park in Montreal showing a golden eagle swooping down to grab a toddler with its talons before dropping the child a few feet off the ground. Within a few hours the video had received up to 5 million hits, and only a day after the video had gone viral was it revealed to be a hoax created using computer generated imagery by students at Centre NAD.
- Hawk Tuah Girl – A video showing a woman named Haliey Welch using the catchphrase hawk tuah, an onomatopoeia for spitting on a man's penis during oral sex.
- Heroine of Hackney – A video showing a local woman from Hackney berating looters during the 2011 England riots.
- Horse Race Tests – A series of Twitter videos by indie game developer Blake Andrews in which poorly drawn, color-coded horses bounce around in a maze to race for a photorealistic carrot. It gained popularity after horses Jovial Merryment and Cyan had implied story arcs.
- Impossible Is Nothing – An exaggerated and falsehood-filled video résumé by Yale student Aleksey Vayner. It was spoofed by actor Michael Cera in a video called "Impossible is the Opposite of Possible."
- Joey Ryan's Penis Wrestling Move – A popular viral video spread via YouTube and Social media showing a professional wrestler named Joey Ryan using his penis to overpower and throw his opponent during a live professional event being run by DDT Pro-Wrestling in Osaka, Japan. The video led to Ryan being featured in print by New York Daily News, Rolling Stone, Sports Illustrated and Vice as well as on television with Highly Questionable, The Soup and Tosh.0.
- Keyboard Cat – Footage of a cat playing an electric keyboard that is appended to the end of blooper or other video as if to play the participants off stage after a mistake or gaffe.
- Kony 2012 – An online video created by Invisible Children, Inc. to highlight the criminal acts of Joseph Kony to an international spotlight as part of a campaign to seek his capture and arrest. The video quickly gained tens of millions of viewers within a week, becoming, according to CNN, "the most viral YouTube video of all time".
- The Last Lecture – Carnegie Mellon University professor Randy Pausch, dying of pancreatic cancer, delivers an upbeat lecture on Really Achieving Your Childhood Dreams.
- Leave Britney Alone! – A viral video of Cara Cunningham lashing out against critics of celebrity Britney Spears.
- Leeroy Jenkins – A 2005 comedy skit recorded in World of Warcraft where a guild is planning a raid into a dungeon when Leeroy, who was away, returns and suddenly charges into the dungeon while yelling his name, causing the other guild members to rush in after him and subsequently get killed. The video has been referenced in several media such as Family Guy, Jeopardy, and How I Met Your Mother. An NPC with the same name and voiced by Ben Schulz, who played Leeroy in the video, was added as part of the Warlords of Draenor expansion set.
- Le Poisson Steve – An anthropomorphic orange fish character created by Victoria Ronat and Thomas Ename. The character first appeared in a TikTok music video.
- Lily's Disneyland Surprise....AGAIN! - A video of parents chatting with their kids and surprising them with a Disneyland trip. It is best known for originating the Side Eyeing Chloe meme.
- lonelygirl15 – A popular viral video spread via YouTube featuring a teenage girl named, "Bree", who would post video updates about a variety of issues dealing with the life of a typical teenager. It was later found to be a professionally made, fictional work, produced by Mesh Flinders in Beverly Hills and starring Jessica Lee Rose.
- MacGyver the Lizard – Videos of a large, dog-like red tegu who comes when his name is called.
- Michelle Jenneke – "Michelle Jenneke dancing sexy as hell at junior world championships in Barcelona 2012" is a video of a 19-year-old hurdler Michelle Jenneke during her pre-race warm-up at the IAAF World Junior Championships in Barcelona. The video of Jenneke dancing pre-race was uploaded on 25 July on YouTube and had more than 13 million views in less than a week. The video made Jenneke an instant online celebrity.
- Minecraft but I survive in parkour civilization [FULL MOVIE] – A two hour video by Youtuber Evbo compiling the episodes of the Minecraft web series "Parkour Civilization".
- My Weekend as a 28-Year-Old in Chicago – A 2-minute video by Judd Crud walking through the increasingly unrealistic events of an imagined weekend in Chicago.
- Nek Minnit – A 10-second YouTube video from New Zealand featuring skater Levi Hawkin. This video inspired the term Nek Minnit, which is used at the end of a sentence in place of the words Next Minute. The video has received over two million views and has been parodied several times on YouTube; the TV3 show The Jono Project ran a series of clips titled Food in a Nek Minnit which parodied a nightly advertisement called Food in a Minute. As a result of the video, the term Nek Minnit was the most searched for word on Google in New Zealand for 2011.
- No pomegranates – a 2017 Twitter video in which Des Moines Area Community College professor Jane Martino is seen yelling at her students not to eat pomegranates. In an interview, Martino explained that she was trying to tell the class that the word "no" did not provide a clear reason as to why children should avoid certain stimuli, such as drugs. Martino added that she chose pomegranates since students are unlikely to regularly consume them.
- My Story: Struggling, bullying, suicide and self-harm – On 7 September 2012, Amanda Todd posted a 9-minute YouTube video entitled My Story: Struggling, bullying, suicide and self-harm, which showed her using a series of flashcards to tell of her experiences being bullied. The video post went viral after her death on 10 October 2012, receiving over 1,600,000 views by 13 October 2012.
- Potter Puppet Pals – A live action puppet show web series created by Neil Cicierega parodying the Harry Potter novel/film series by J. K. Rowling. Its video titled "The Mysterious Ticking Noise" has received more than 184 million views as of January 2019, making it the most famous video of the series.
- Ricardo Milos – A 2011 short video of the then-model and occasional porn actor Ricardo Milos surfaced on Nico Nico Douga in 2010. The video consists of Milos dancing erotically in nothing but a US flag jock strap, boots, and a red bandana on his head.
- Rejected – A viral animated short film by Don Hertzfeldt introduced as a collection of unaired promo interstitials and rejected advertisements. In the early 2000s copies of the film turned it into a viral hit.
- Rise – A video of a zero-gravity indicator went viral on social media, garnering over 1.5 million views. It was actively commented on by space conspiracy theorists, who claimed that the Artemis II mission was staged.
- Shia LaBeouf's Motivational Speech – A video of actor Shia LaBeouf giving a motivational speech. The video, a sequence from LaBeouf, Rönkkö & Turner's #INTRODUCTIONS project, was filmed against a green background and could be easily chroma keyed. Due to this, the video was used in various memes and the phrase "Just Do It" became associated with the video.
- The Spirit of Christmas – Consists of two different animated short films made by Trey Parker and Matt Stone. To differentiate the two, they are often referred to as Jesus vs. Frosty (1992) and Jesus vs. Santa (1995). Brian Graden sent copies of Jesus vs. Santa to several of his friends, and from there it was copied and distributed, including on the internet, where it became one of the first viral videos. They were created by animating construction paper cutouts with stop motion, and features prototypes of the main characters of South Park.
- Star Wars Kid – A Québécois teenager became known as the "Star Wars Kid" after a video appeared on the Internet showing him swinging a golf ball retriever as if it were a lightsaber. Many parodies of the video were also made and circulated.
- This is my story – A two-part video of 18-year-old American Internet personality Ben Breedlove explaining his heart condition using note cards as a visual aid. The YouTube video was released on 18 December 2011, a week prior to Breedlove's death, and received worldwide attention.
- Too Many Cooks – A 2014 short produced by Adult Swim that parodies the openings of many 1980s and 1990s American television shows with both meta and dark humor. Originally only played on Cartoon Network in place of early morning infomercials, the short soon gained attraction via social media.
- Ty kto takoy? Davay, do svidaniya! ("Who are you? Come on, goodbye!" in Russian) – A video of Azerbaijani meykhana performers, that gained over 2 million views on YouTube. The jingle "Ty kto takoy? Davay, do svidaniya!" started trending on Twitter with the Russian hashtag #путинтыктотакойдавайдосвидания and a number of songs sampled the jingle since then.

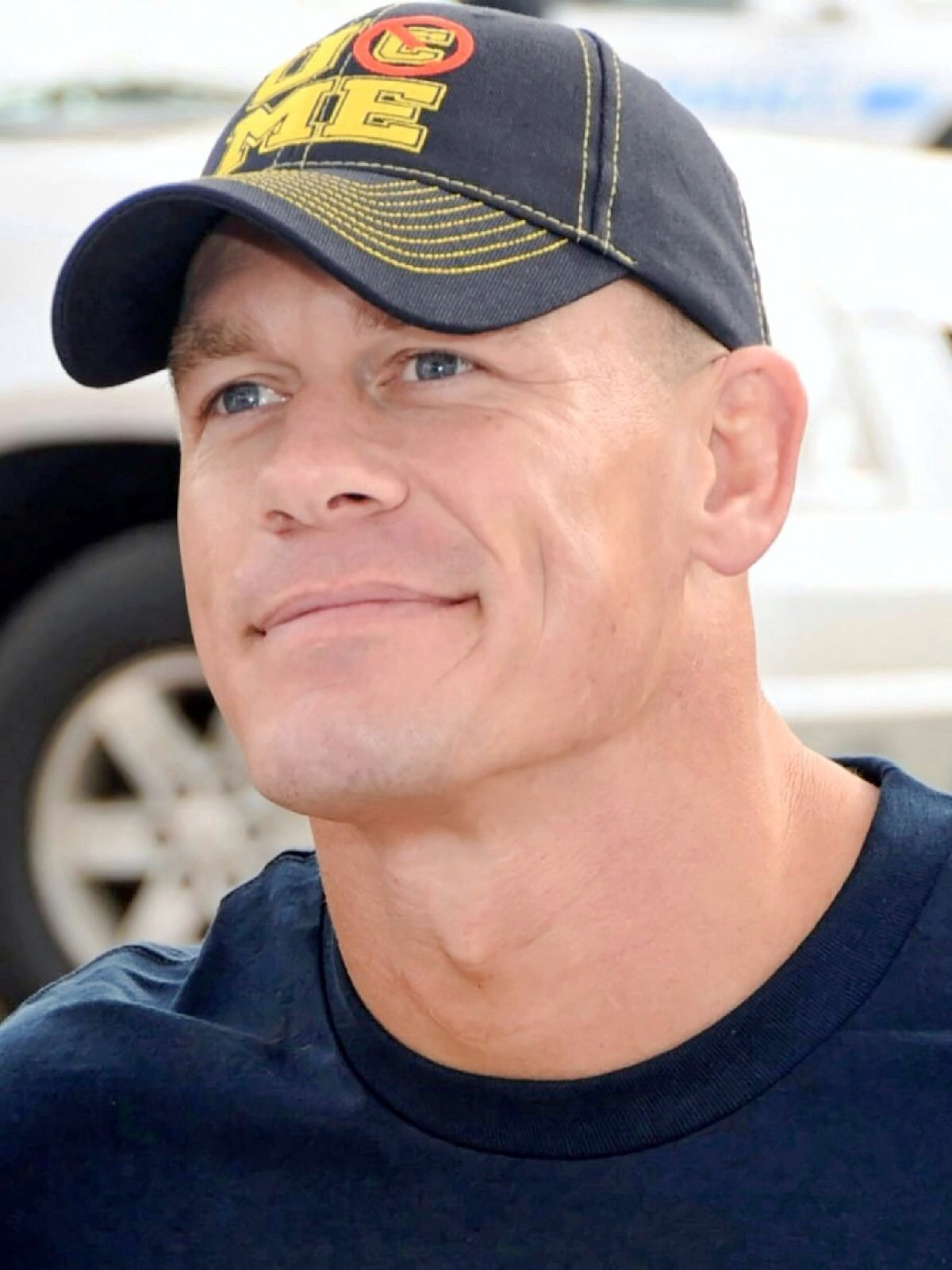
Professional wrestler John Cena's elaborate entrances to his matches became part of the Unexpected John Cena meme.

- Unexpected John Cena – Similar to Rickrolling, videos which seem to progress normally but then are interrupted using the video of wrestler John Cena's entrance song "The Time is Now" and performance, as if Cena were a scene stealer.
- Umehara ga kimeta – This 17-second video contains commentary from a fighting game tournament. The enthusiastic commentators cry became so popular with users that it has been viewed millions of times and spawned hundreds of mashups.
- Username:666 – A Japanese short horror video created by PiroPito depicting a user attempting to view the page of user "666" on YouTube, coming across a distorted and demonic version of the user's page.
- We did it, Joe! – A 2020 video shared on Twitter in which Kamala Harris calls Joe Biden to congratulate him on winning the 2020 United States presidential election.
- Wealdstone Raider – A video of Wealdstone FC supporter Gordon Hill shouting at fans of opposing Whitehawk FC, including the phrases "You want some?", "I'll give it ya [sic]", and "You've got no fans". Uploaded to YouTube in March 2013, the video went viral towards the end of 2014, culminating in a campaign by the Daily Mirror newspaper to get Hill to Christmas number one; his resultant charity single, "Got No Fans", reached number 5 in the UK Singles Charts.
- "Wicked Witch of the East, bro!" – A 2018 viral video of two men debating, energetically, the narrative signifiers of witchery contra princesshood in the Wizard of Oz universe. The main characters of the clip, originally posted as a YouTube Short, are Matt Passero of Oshawa, Ontario, and his cousin Doug. According to one account, the origin of the dispute was "They were playing Headbands and Doug had 'Glenda' [sic] (the fairy/witch in the pink dress who talked to Dorothy in the Wizard of Oz), and the other guy said 'Princess' as a hint. Doug didn't get it and insisted Glenda wasn't a princess. Then the other guy made this rant that is pure gold." Canonically, Matt is wrong, "Glinda is neither the sister of the Wicked Witch of the East or West, who are sisters, nor is she a princess." In 2021, Passero commented on the clip, "I am wrong, but I am also right." The brief but vociferous argument has spawned some popular catchphrases, with one filmmaker commenting, "I tend to use, 'She came down in a bubble, Doug' as conversational shorthand for a dispute that's inconsequential."
- Wombo combo – Footage from a Super Smash Bros. Melee tournament known for its exceptionally loud commentary. The most famous line, "wombo combo", is spoken by Brandon "HomeMadeWaffles" Collier. Wombo Combo has been used in many MLG parodies and is one of the memes seen in the Wii U eShop game Meme Run.
- Will Smith Slap – A clip from the 94th Academy Awards where actor Will Smith slaps comedian Chris Rock in the face after he told a joke about the shaved hair of Smith's wife.
- Zombie Kid Likes Turtles – Jonathon Ware, a boy with zombie face paint, says "I like turtles" on a KGW news segment. Within hours of being posted, the video attained more than 500,000 views.
- Zoom Cat Lawyer – A live stream of a Texas virtual court proceeding over Zoom where attorney Rod Ponton has difficulties attempting to disable a cat filter on his webcam, telling the judge that "I'm not a cat".

== Public service announcements ==
- Cow (2009) – A public service announcement graphically depicting the dangers of distracted driving. A clip from the video received over one million views on YouTube by 25 August 2009.
- Dumb Ways to Die (2012) – A music video featuring "a variety of cute characters killing themselves in increasingly idiotic ways" that went viral through sharing and social media. It was part of a public service announcement advertisement campaign by Metro Trains in Melbourne, Australia to promote rail safety.
- Embrace Life (2010) – A public service announcement for seat belt advocacy made for a local area of the United Kingdom that achieved a million hits on its first two weeks on YouTube in 2010.
- Set Yourself Free (2014) – A fictitious public service announcement that discouraged truancy in schools. As of 2017, the video has over 20 million views on YouTube.

== See also ==
- Internet meme
- Index of Internet-related articles
- List of Internet phenomena
- List of YouTube videos
- List of YouTubers
- List of most-viewed YouTube videos
- Outline of the Internet
