= Aghasalim =

Aghasalim is a given name. Notable people with the name include:

- Aghasalim Childagh (1930–2008), Azerbaijani musician
- Aghasalim Mirjavadov (born 1947), Azerbaijani football coach
