= Aghasalim Childagh =

Aghasalim Childagh Ağasəlim Çildağ
- Born: Agasalim Aliaga oghlu Salimov; 31 August 1930; Maştağa, Baku, Azerbaijan SSR, Transcaucasian SFSR, Soviet Union
- Died: 8 April 2008 (aged 77) Maştağa, Baku Azerbaijan
- Genres: Meykhana
- Occupation: Singer
- Years active: 1986–1994

Aghasalim Aliaga oghlu Salimov (Note: Azerbaijani: Ağasəlim Əliağa oğlu Səlimov); 31 August 1930 – 8 April 2008), known by his stage name Aghasalim Childagh (Note: Azerbaijani: Ağasəlim Çildağ) was a performer of Azerbaijani meykhana music. He was popular across Caucasus, having reached the height of his career in the late 1980s and early 1990s.

== Early career ==
Born in Mashtaga village of Baku, Childagh was interested in performing from an early age. He was taught by Aliagha Vahid and meykhana master Aghahuseyn, which later made him a very successful musician.

== Fame ==
Like many other meykhana artists based in Azerbaijan, Childag spent more time performing in rural areas than in the city, due to curfews and musical restrictions in Azerbaijan at the time. Childag became one of the most prolific artists on the meykhana scene, recording around 100 cassettes during his career. In 2006, he received Shohrat Order for his contributions to music.

== Later years ==
After suffering from a stroke, his health later gradually declined and led him to live impaired health.
