= Mashadibaba Aydamirov =

Mashadibaba Məşədibaba
- Born: Mashadibaba Bilal ogly Aydamirov; 13 February 1971; Maştağa, Baku, Azerbaijan SSR, Soviet Union
- Died: 10 January 2011 (aged 39) Maştağa, Baku, Azerbaijan
- Genres: Meykhana
- Occupations: Singer; Poet
- Instrument: Singing
- Years active: 1984–2010

Mashadibaba Bilal ogly Aydamirov (Note: Azerbaijani: Məşədibaba Bilal oğlu Aydəmirov) (13 February 1971 – 10 January 2011, known mononymously as Mashadibaba) was a performer of Azerbaijani meykhana music and poet.

== Biography ==
Mashadibaba was born in Mastaga, Baku, Azerbaijani SSR, USSR and started to perform meykhana in 1984, in his early teens. Before performing, Mashadibaba wrote poems and songs, and later took to meykhana due to financial difficulties. In the early 1990s he rose to prominence with his friend Elchin Atakishiyev, who was also a distinguished performer. Rumors had it that Mashadibaba was consuming a huge amount of alcohol at the time. He served six years in prison for killing Elchin Atakishiyev. As a result, a drinking spree-related nervous breakdown brought the performer to depression. By this time Mashadibaba had been suffering from long-time alcoholism. Because of his ensuing health problems and after divorcing his wife, Mashadibaba underwent another nervous breakdown. His performing abilities also deteriorated, and he committed suicide by self-immolation on 10 January 2011 in Mashtaga, Baku, Azerbaijan.
