= Popcat =

2020 Internet meme

Popcat is an Internet meme originating in October 2020, in a series of videos which showcase two images of a domestic short-haired cat named 'Oatmeal', where one image has its mouth closed and the other has its mouth open, with the second image being edited to give its mouth an 'O' shape. The meme was later created into a popular game. It has since also been made into a widely available Solana-Based Cryptocurrency.

== Internet meme ==
Oatmeal is a cat owned by a Twitter user named Xavier BFB, who first started the meme by posting to a private Discord server a video of Oatmeal chirping at a bug in mid-October 2020. It was then turned into a gif and posted on the reddit subreddit Meow IRL on October 9 by a friend of Xavier BFB. On 10 October, it was reposted onto Twitter where it gained over a million views. This sudden popularity then led to Xavier BFB uploading to Twitter the original video of Oatmeal chirping at a bug on 11 October. However, it would be until it was utilized in music videos on Instagram where the gif was synced to the music to give the belief that Oatmeal was singing, that it would become popular. Its popularity in music videos would also lead the meme to become known as 'wide-mouth singing cat'.

== Popcat.click game ==
A game around the meme, called Popcat.click, would be later be launched on 11 December 2020, by three students from the University of Sheffield in the United Kingdom; Rain O'Sullivan, Ed Hails and Freddy Heppell. The game revolved around the user clicking on an image of Oatmeal, in which the cat opens its mouth the same way it did in the viral memes and makes a pop noise. Each click contributes to their user's nation rank on a leaderboard. As of 20 August 2023, the leaderboard consists of 237 nations; with Hong Kong, Taiwan and Thailand being in the top 3; whilst Nauru, Montserrat and Saint Barthélemy are ranked as the bottom three.

=== Spread ===
In a similar way to the online meme, the effects of the COVID-19 pandemic increased its popularity as many people gained more free time due to lockdowns. On 9 February 2021, the game launched an official Twitter account which became popular in Brazil, causing Brazil reaching the first million clicks on 10 February. The game then experienced a surge in popularity in April 2021 in Europe where the leaderboard was dominated by European nations with Finland as number one. Its popularity in Finland would result in its ban in multiple schools in the country.

The game would then see continued popularity during and after the Tokyo Olympics, especially in Asia. This would later lead to Taiwan becoming the top nation on the leaderboard ahead of Finland and Sweden on 12 August 2021, following the success of Chinese Taipei at the 2020 Summer Olympics. During the 2020–2021 Thai protests, the game became very popular among the Thai youth, resulting in Thailand overtaking Taiwan to become the top nation on the leaderboard. In Malaysia, calls for then Muhyiddin Yassin to resign saw Malaysia become third on the leaderboard. On Twitter, the link between popcat and protests saw its use as a hashtag by pro-democracy users along with the Milk Tea Alliance against China and authoritarian leaders.

At the end of 2021, Popcat was listed as the No.1 top trending game for 2021, following Google Trends release of its annual Year in Search results.

=== Knock-offs ===
The game's popularity has also caused a series of websites based around the same premise. In Thailand, a game called popyut.click launched with popcat being replaced by images of Prime Minister Prayut Chan-o-Cha opening and closing his mouth in the manner of popcat. This was later replaced by images of him falling down playing football. The creator previously created another website which showed a countdown timer to mock Prayut Chan-o-Cha's previous promise to reopen Thailand within 120 days. The game would accumulate over 99 billion clicks, with the leaderboard being sorted by Thai provinces. However, the website was closed down by the Ministry of Digital Economy and Society on 1 August 2021. Similar to popyut, another knock-off called popdin launched in Malaysia where popcat is replaced the former Prime Minister of Malaysia, Muhyiddin Yassin. In it, the leaderboard consists of the districts of Malaysia. Other knock-offs include popdog, which replaces popcat with a dog; and popass, which replaces popcat with Ricardo Milos.

== See also ==
- Cats and the Internet
