= H. polyclada =

H. polyclada may refer to:

- Hatschbachiella polyclada, a South American daisy
- Hibbertia polyclada, a Guinea flower
