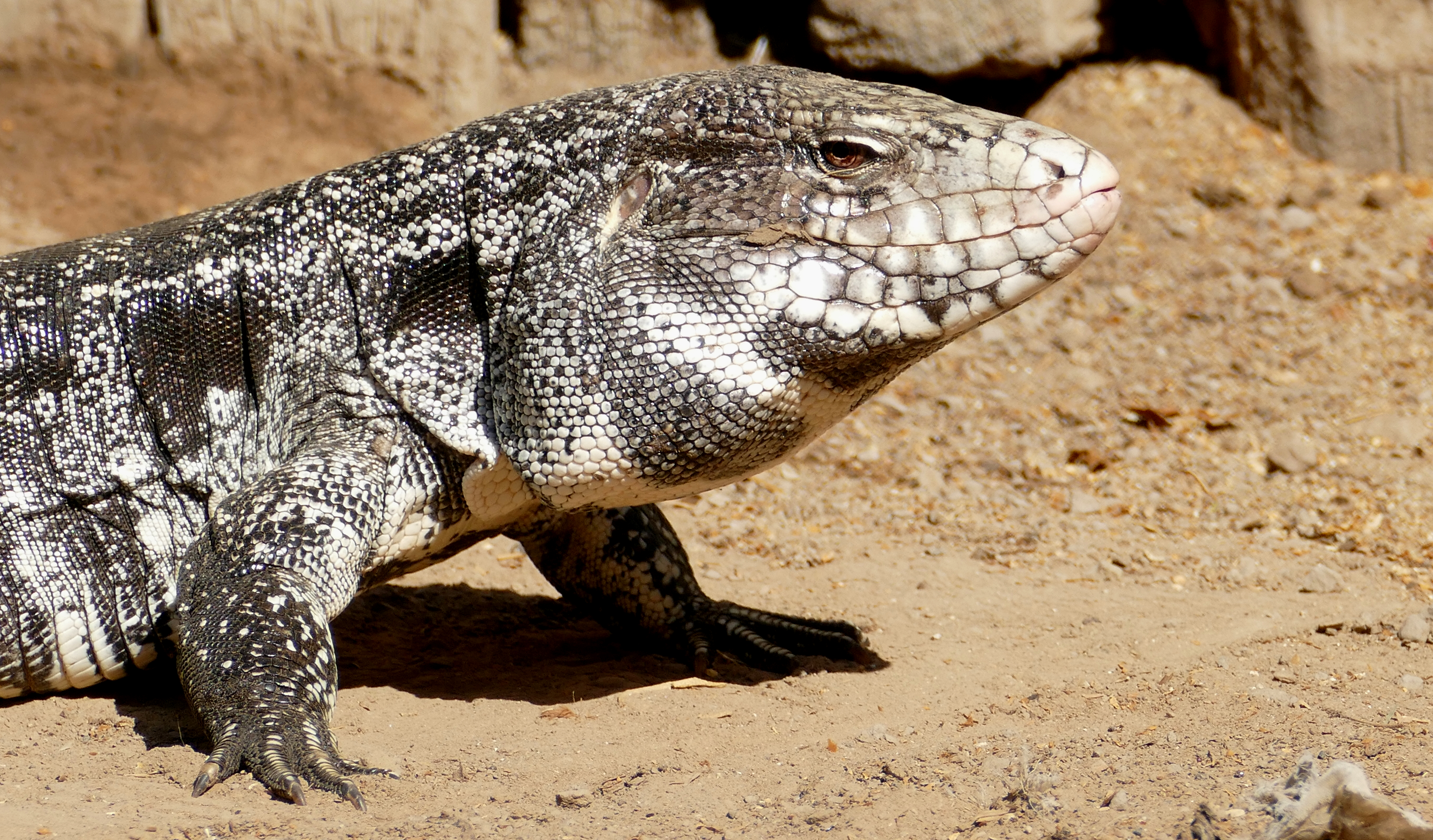
- Argentine black and white tegu (Salvator merianae)

Scientific classification
- Kingdom: Animalia
- Phylum: Chordata
- Class: Reptilia
- Order: Squamata
- Family: Teiidae
- Genus: Salvator; A.M.C. Duméril & Bibron, 1839

Type species
- Salvator merianae A.M.C. Duméril & Bibron, 1839

= Salvator (lizard) =

Genus of lizards

Salvator is a genus of lizards known as tegus which belong to the family Teiidae. The genus is endemic to South America.

== Description ==
Tegus are large reptiles, with some species reaching a total length of around 1.23 m (4.0 ft), and a weight of approximately 6.8 kg (15 lb). These opportunistic, wide-ranging lizards can be found in a variety of habitats, from swamps to rain forests to savannas and cities. Although terrestrial, they are capable swimmers, able to remain submerged for up to 22 minutes and having even been caught in gill nets set at sea. Biomechanical studies have shown that tegus have stronger limb bones than comparably-sized mammals or birds, a trait that may be inherent to amphibians and reptiles. They exhibit social and maternal behaviour; female tegus construct burrows to lay their eggs in, and will protect their brood until they hatch. Up to 35 eggs are produced in a clutch. Tegus will hibernate together in groups, though males exhibit territorial behavior towards each other.

Tegus exhibit sexual dimorphism. Males display greatly expanded and prominent "jowls" along the base of the lower jaw. These jowls are the result of extensive growth of the ventral pterygoideus muscles (a prominent jaw closing muscle in reptiles). Though both sexes exhibit hypertrophy of the ventral pterygoideus muscle, likely in response to their durophagous habits, male tegus show both greater relative and absolute muscle mass compared to females. Further evidence for sexual selection of these jowls comes from observations that ventral pterygoideus muscle mass increases in males during the reproductive season.

Metabolic changes also occur during the reproductive season, in which the body temperature is increased up to 10 degrees Celsius (18 degrees Fahrenheit) and sustained internally like a bird or a mammal. This discovery has major evolutionary implications, providing support for the hypothesis that endothermy may have evolved in response to parental care.

== Ecology ==
Tegus are omnivorous, foraging for a wide range of foods using their forked tongues, including fruit, fungi, various arthropods, small vertebrates, carrion, and eggs. The amount of meat that is consumed by tegus decreases as the animals mature. As adults, tegus have few predators. Among them are big cats, birds of prey and large snakes. Tegus defend themselves using their powerful jaws, which can exert forces of up to 1000N. A bite from an adult tegu can crush human fingers.

Though more terrestrial (morphologically less well-adapted for climbing into tree canopies or for swimming), tegus fill an ecological niche in South America similar to that filled by monitor lizards in Africa, Asia and Australia, and are an example of convergent evolution. Though similar in appearance to monitors, tegus are not closely related and can be distinguished by their larger heads, shorter necks, heavier bodies and different arrangement of the scales on the body and tail. Monitors have laterally compressed tails, well-suited for aquatic propulsion, while tegus' tails are more cylindrical or even broader than high. In addition, tegus are facultative bipeds while monitors are obligate quadrupeds.

== Economic importance and environmental impact ==
Tegus are among the most commercially exploited reptiles in the world. Up to 1,000,000 are harvested annually in their native Argentina for their hide and meat, and are particularly important as a source of income in rural or indigenous communities. Tegus can also be found in captivity, where they are bred for the pet trade. They are reported to be highly intelligent, becoming docile as they mature and in some cases even ignoring food in favor of social interaction. However, tegus have demanding husbandry requirements due to their large size.

Within their native range, tegus are often thought of as pests, sometimes raiding chicken coops to feed on the eggs or fowl. They are noted predators of ground nesting bird and crocodilian eggs, and in some areas 80% of spectacled caiman nests are destroyed by tegus. In Florida, they have become an invasive species, and prey on the eggs of American alligators instead. Predation by feral tegus may pose a threat to Florida's endangered wildlife, such as the Key Largo woodrat and the American crocodile. Due to their fruit eating habits, tegus may serve an important ecological function by dispersing seeds through their droppings.

== Species ==
Listed alphabetically.

Image	Scientific name	Common name	Distribution
	Salvator duseni (Lönnberg, 1910)	yellow tegu	Bolivia, Brazil, Paraguay
	Salvator merianae A.M.C. Duméril & Bibron, 1839	Argentine black and white tegu, blue tegu, Chacoan giant tegu	Argentina, Brazil, Paraguay, Uruguay
	Salvator rufescens (Günther, 1871)	red tegu	Argentina, Bolivia, Paraguay

Nota bene: A binomial authority in parentheses indicates that the species was originally described in a genus other than Salvator.
