= Nizami Ramzi =

Azerbaijani musician

- Born: Nizami Ramzi ogly Bakhshiyev; December 20, 1947; Baku, Azerbaijani SSR, USSR
- Origin: Khizi, Azerbaijan
- Died: January 19, 1997 (aged 49) Baku, Azerbaijan
- Genres: Meykhana
- Occupation: Singer
- Years active: 1988–1997

Nizami Ramzi ogly Bakshiyev, also known as Nizami Ramzi (Azerbaijani: Nizami Rəmzi; December 20, 1947 in Baku, Soviet Union – January 19, 1997 in Baku, Azerbaijan), was a performer of Azerbaijani meykhana music.

== Biography ==
After finishing technical school in 1967, Ramzi started his career as a driver. In 1988, he created "Meykhana" folklore ensemble. In 1991, he was filmed in Gazalkhan movie. On January 19, 1997, Ramzi with meykhana performer Kabir were killed in a motor vehicle accident.
