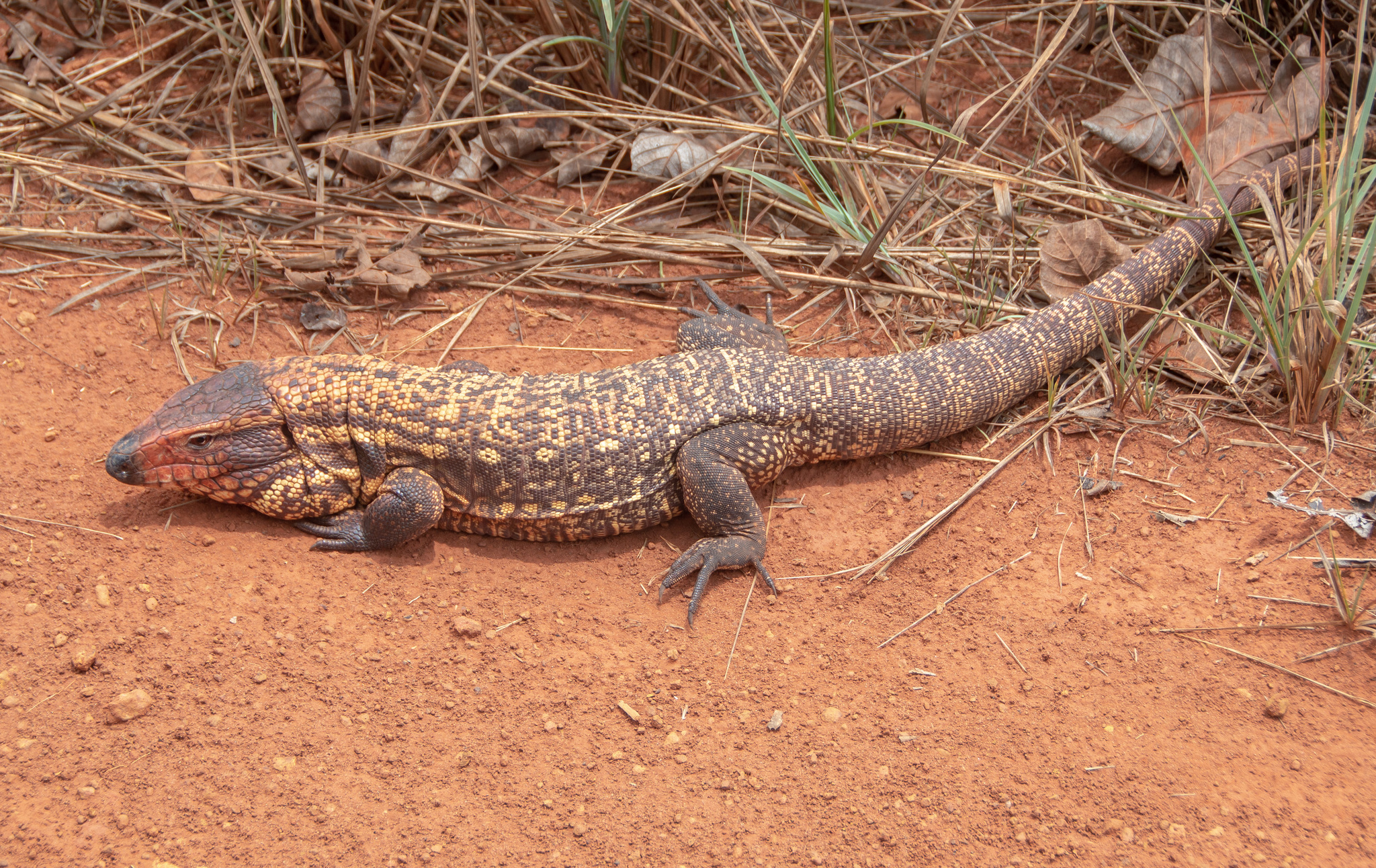
- In Goiás, Brazil.

Conservation status
- CITES Appendix II
- Least Concern (IUCN 3.1)

Scientific classification
- Kingdom: Animalia
- Phylum: Chordata
- Class: Reptilia
- Order: Squamata
- Family: Teiidae
- Genus: Salvator
- Species: S. duseni

Binomial name
- Salvator duseni (Lönnberg, 1910)

Synonyms
- Tupinambis duseni Lönnberg, 1910; Salvator duseni — Harvey, Ugueto & Gutberlet, 2012

= Salvator duseni =

Species of lizard

Salvator duseni is a species of lizard in the family Teiidae. The species is sometimes known commonly as the yellow tegu. It is native to South America.

== Etymology ==
S. duseni is named after Swedish botanist Per Karl Hjalmar Dusén who collected the holotype.

== Geographic range ==
S. duseni is found in Brazil, Bolivia and Paraguay. In Brazil it is found in Bahia, Distrito Federal, Goiás, Mato Grosso, Mato Grosso do Sul, Minas Gerais, Paraná, and Tocantins.

== Habitat ==
The preferred natural habitat of S. duseni is savanna.

== Description ==
S. duseni can grow to 41 cm (16.1 in) in snout-to-vent length (SVL).

== Behavior ==
S. duseni is diurnal and terrestrial.

== Diet ==
An omnivore, S. duseni eats plants, invertebrates, and small vertebrates.

== Reproduction ==
S. duseni is oviparous. Clutch size is approximately 36 eggs.
