= Hatschbachiella =

Scientific classification
- Kingdom: Plantae
- Clade: Embryophytes
- Clade: Tracheophytes
- Clade: Spermatophytes
- Clade: Angiosperms
- Clade: Eudicots
- Clade: Asterids
- Order: Asterales
- Family: Asteraceae
- Subfamily: Asteroideae
- Tribe: Eupatorieae
- Genus: Hatschbachiella; R.M.King & H.Rob.

Type species
- Eupatorium tweedieanum Hook. ex Hook. & Arn.

Genus of flowering plants

Hatschbachiella is a genus of South American flowering plants in the family Asteraceae.

Species

- Hatschbachiella polyclada (Dusén ex Malme) R.M.King & H.Rob. - Paraná
- Hatschbachiella tweedieana (Hook. ex Hook. & Arn.) R.M.King & H.Rob. - Brazil, Bolivia, Paraguay, Uruguay
