= Arrest of Vladimir Putin: A Report from the Courtroom =

2012 viral video

"Arrest of Vladimir Putin: A Report from the Courtroom" (Russian: «Арест Владимира Путина: репортаж из зала суда») is a viral video, originally posted on YouTube on 13 February 2012, by the Russian video publishing group "Lancelot". The mock video shows then-Russian Prime Minister Vladimir Putin facing a courtroom trial. The footage was taken from the real-life trial of Mikhail Khodorkovsky and then digitally altered to make a faux news report. Putin's reply to the judge is taken from television footage where Putin is participating in the 2010 census.

The video was viewed nearly 3 million times within three days and as of June 2020 had nearly 13 million views. Khodorkovsky's legal team placed a link to the video on his Twitter feed. The video was also reposted at the LiveJournal blog of Alexei Navalny.

Putin's supporters made their own prank video in response, titled "Russia Without Putin – Russia Without a Future". The video plays on the popular "Russia without Putin" chant that was frequently used during the opposition protests in Russia.

Days after the video was released it was revealed to be a trailer for the documentary A Coup On Russia, filmed in 2002 and banned in Russia.

The video had the identifier "v1hLtFn4CLU". The video has since been taken down by YouTube for, according to the site, "violating YouTube's Community Guidelines", but archived versions exist. The video had 82.1 thousand likes.

== See also ==
- International Criminal Court arrest warrants for Russian leaders
- List of viral videos
