= Rashad Daghly =

- Born: April 21, 1984; Baku, Azerbaijan SSR, Soviet Union
- Genre: Meykhana
- Occupation: Singer
- Years active: 1998–2022
- Spouse: Naila Suleymanzadeh (m. 2010; div. 2019)

Rashad Daghly (Azerbaijani: Rəşad Dağlı, born April 21, 1984, in Baku, Azerbaijan SSR), also known as Rashad Vagif oglu Amirov, is an Azerbaijani meykhana performer.

Daghly gained popularity under the mentorship of Nizami Remzi and participated in the "De gelsin" meykhana competition in 2001 and 2011, which aired on Azerbaijani TV channels.

In 2010, Daghly married Naila Suleymanzadeh, and they have two children. However, their marriage ended in August 2019 after Suleymanzadeh filed for divorce, citing domestic disputes, and filed a petition with the Xetai District Court.

Daghly appeared on the ANS TV reality show "Mashin Show" in 2015 but was involved in a car accident in June 2016 on the Baku-Qazakh highway, resulting in a broken arm for him and leg injuries for the car's owner, Perviz Bulbule.

On November 9, 2022, Daghly was involved in a fatal altercation with Iskender Mehtiyev in the Qaradag district of Baku. During an argument, Daghly reportedly stabbed Iskender 14 times, causing him to suffer a heart attack and die. Daghly threw Iskender's body out of the car and fled the scene but later turned himself in to the police, confessing to the crime. Daghly claimed that he had acted in self-defense, stating that he was being blackmailed by Mehtiyev. The Qaradag District Court subsequently charged Daghly with murder with intent under Article 120.1 of the Criminal Code and sentenced him to 9 years and 6 months in prison.
