= Ela Giorgi =

2008 viral YouTube video

- Greek: Έλα Γιώργη
- Release date: 8 August 2008
- Running time: 18 seconds
- Country: Greece

Ela Giorgi is a viral video of a 2008 traffic accident that gained popularity on YouTube and Greek social media in 2019.

== The event ==
In 2008 (on an uncertain date), two young men were moving at high speed on a mountain road in a van near the village of Vachos in Viannos, municipality of Heraklion, Crete. Due to the high speed while passing through a tight bend, the driver named "Georgis" lost control, resulting in the vehicle overturning. None of them were seriously injured.

== Popularity ==
As of 2019, due to its comic-tragic nature, and especially the catchphrase "Πω-πω, μια στροφάρα∙ έλα, Γιώργη!" ("Wow, what a curve; come on, Georgis!") that the passenger said to Georgis, the taped recording of the incident gained great popularity. That year, News247.gr reported more than 20,000,000 views on various reposts of the record. In 2022, Neakriti.gr reported more than 1,200,000 views on the original video. Escalating its popularity, a commemorative plaque was placed by the YouTube channel "Geo Tube" at the perceived site of the incident.

== See also ==
- List of viral videos
