= Hatschbachiella polyclada =

Scientific classification
- Kingdom: Plantae
- Clade: Tracheophytes
- Clade: Angiosperms
- Clade: Eudicots
- Clade: Asterids
- Order: Asterales
- Family: Asteraceae
- Genus: Hatschbachiella
- Species: H. polyclada

Binomial name
- Hatschbachiella polyclada (Dusén ex Malme) R.M.King & H.Rob.

Synonyms
- Eupatorium polycladum

Species of flowering plant

Hatschbachiella polyclada is a South American plant species that was first described by Swedish botanist Per Karl Hjalmar Dusén.
