= MacGyver the Lizard =

Lizard and Internet celebrity

- Species: Argentine red tegu
- Sex: Male
- Hatched: MacGyver; July 4, 2012 (age 14); Punta Gorda, Florida, U.S.
- Nationality: American
- Occupation: Internet celebrity
- Known for: YouTube; Instagram; Facebook; $MAGAIBA
- Weight: 7.5 kg (17 lb)
- Named after: MacGyver

YouTube information
- Channel: MacGyver the Lizard
- Years active: 2012–present
- Subscribers: 51.7 thousand
- Views: 6.9 million
- Last updated: June 14, 2021
- Official website

MacGyver the Lizard (hatched July 4, 2012) is a red tegu lizard and Internet celebrity known for his intelligence, friendly personality, and large jowls. MacGyver has been described as "a good ambassador of the giant lizard world" for his docile and apparently affectionate behavior.

== Background ==
MacGyver was hatched at Ty Park's lizard farm in Punta Gorda, Florida, on July 4, 2012. He became an Internet sensation later that year when his first viral video, a montage of short clips, appeared on YouTube and received hundreds of thousands of views in the time span of a few weeks. Since the age of three weeks, he has starred in numerous videos in which he appears to come when his owners call his name. He is also regularly seen eating his favorite foods: salmon, eggs, cherries, and grapes, as well as cuddling with his owners.

== Fandom ==
MacGyver's videos have received tens of millions of combined video views across YouTube, Facebook, and Instagram. As a result, he has amassed a social media following in the hundreds of thousands since first appearing on YouTube in 2012, and inspired a fan art hashtag on Instagram that contains pencil sketches, watercolor paintings, photoshops, and various other fan-created works depicting the large red lizard. In July 2016, a fan meetup with MacGyver was held at the San Diego Reptile Supershow.

The memecoin $MAGAIBA is based on MacGyver. It was created in 2024 by the hosts of the "Círculo Vicioso" podcast and uses the Solana blockchain. The coin's name is derived from the way MacGyver's name was pronounced in a viral 2017 video. $MAGAIBA reached an all-time high market capitalization of $20 million at $0.02 per coin.

== International media coverage ==
MacGyver has received international coverage from a variety of publications such as Vice Media, BuzzFeed, Business Insider, the New York Post, Rare, The Daily Telegraph, Stern, and as far away as China Times and Okezone.com.

On September 7, 2016, AJ+ released a two-minute video about MacGyver and his owners, receiving millions of views on Facebook. On September 11, 2016 The Post featured MacGyver for their weekly Pet Instagram Review, making him the first reptile to be featured for the segment.

== Television appearances ==
- Oct. 9, 2013: ABC Channel 10 WPBF News
- Sept. 9, 2016: Right This Minute
- Dec. 6, 2016: KGTV 10 News
