= Meykhana =

Azerbaijani literary and folk rap tradition

Meykhana (Azerbaijani: Meyxana) is a distinctive Azerbaijani literary and folk rap tradition, consisting of an unaccompanied song performed by one or more people improvising on a particular subject. Meykhana is variation of the aytysh genre of music, which is distinct from spoken word poetry in that it is performed in time to a beat, and competitive.

Meykhana is often compared to hip hop music, also known as national rap among Azerbaijani residents, as it also includes performers that is spoken lyrically, in rhyme and verse, generally to an instrumental or synthesized beat. Performers also incorporate synthesizers, drum machines, and live bands. Meykhana masters may write, memorize, or improvise their lyrics and perform their works a cappella or to a beat.

== Etymology ==
The name of this genre comes from the traditional Persian meykhane (tavern, pub), which itself originated from the Persian word mey (wine) and khane (house). The professional performers of meykhana are known as the Söz Ustadı (Word Masters) in Azerbaijani, also called as the meykhana masters.

== History ==
=== Soviet pressure (1940–1991) ===
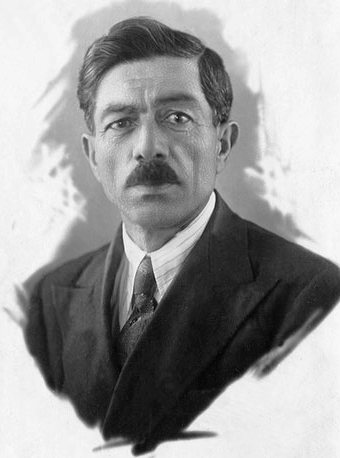
Aliagha Vahid widely known as popularising meykhana during Soviet period

Meykhana was performed among the youth of Baku settlements in the pre-Revolutionary time. Although during the Soviet period meykhana was banned, the poetry of Aliagha Vahid was often rhymed as a contemporary meykhana. This could be related to the meykhana's popularity among the residents of Baku and Absheron regions.

=== Popular acceptance (1991–2001) ===
After Soviet Union's downfall, meykhana found mainstream acceptance in Azerbaijan, though many fundamentalists still protested the genre, saying that it was still too liberal and in contrast to traditional national values. They claimed the musical genre still promoted sexuality, alcohol, drugs and Western consumer culture, but critics of the fundamentalist viewpoint stated that fundamentalists and meykhana musicians were ultimately seeking converts from the same population, the youth, who often had to choose where they belonged between the two cultures.

New performers emerged in this era with their distinctive takes on meykhana: Aghasalim Childagh, Kabir Azeri, Aghamirza Mammadov, Aghakarim Novruzov, Elchin Mashtagaly and Mashadibaba Aydamirov started the meykhana wave, combining Azerbaijani national music-influenced meykhana music with electronic music. Nizami Ramzi was first meykhana master to be ever performed in national television and in popular movies.

=== Contemporary mainstream meykhana (2001–present) ===
As the 90s progressed, meykhana's sound became more standardized as newer performers drew inspiration for the same collective set of influences that included Aydin Khirdalanli, Rashad Daghly, Elshan Khazar, Vahid Gadim, Mahir Ju'rat, Oktay, Vugar Mashtagaly and Namig Mana. Namig Garachukhurlu, in particular, with its romantic dissonance and duos with Azerbaijani pop singers like Aygun Kazimova, created the sonic template for a new movement, which became known as popular music-meykhana songs. However, this produced division among meykhana performers. The fundamentalist meykhana performers decided to keep the classical style which they have used through last decades, while the new wave of meykhana performers decided to combine meykhana with different musical genres.

With the increased popularity of meykhana in the 1990s and the 2000s, television channels started broadcasting and creating meykhana tournaments. The television programs such as De, Gəlsin! (Say, Come On!) in ANS TV led meykhana to popularize even more among local residents and demand for meykhana increased significantly in Azerbaijani weddings.

== Derivatives and offshoots ==
The most known type of meykhana is verbal exchange (deyişmə), where some phrase or sentence forms a rhyme with the following couplets.

== Censorship of meykhana ==
Throughout the course of meykhana music's development and commercialization in Azerbaijan, there have been many attempts to stifle the art form. From lyrical content to the album cover images, meykhana has been a controversial music. Religious identity and transnationalism function to define the complexities of Azerbaijani identity in world. This complex identity is expressed through meykhana and is often contested and censored in many cultural contexts.

Meykhana started to circulate on a larger mainstream scale, via cassette tape sales, TV exposure, and radio play, adding to the national economy. However, as the music mainstreamed, its audio and visual content became more tamed by the government in hopes to reach a larger audience. In essence, the government attempted to "clean up" meykhana's content and image to adhere to the religious beliefs instilled in Azerbaijani culture.

== Delivery ==
To successfully deliver a meykhana, a meykhana master must also develop vocal presence, enunciation, and breath control. Vocal presence is the distinctiveness of a meykhana master's voice on record. Enunciation is essential to a flowing meykhana couplets; some meykhana masters choose also to exaggerate it for comic and artistic effect. Breath control, taking in air without interrupting one's delivery, is an important skill for a meykhana performer to master.

Meykhana couplets are always delivered with melody. The ability to compose quickly, meaningful and clearly meykhana couplets is regarded as an important sign of skill.

== Social impact ==
The nationwide popularity of meykhana music meant that it became a major influence on culture, fashion and social attitudes. Different subgenres of meykhana were adopted by, and became central to, the identity of a large number of sub-cultures. These reforms also laid the foundation of the modern Azerbaijani hip hop, who adopted meykhana style, respectively in the 1990s. Since its early development meykhana has been associated with rebellion against social and political norms, most obviously in early meykhana music's rejection of a government dominated culture, the counter-culture's rejection of consumerism of all forms of social convention.

On 30 May 2012, an anti-Putin Twitter message started trending worldwide after opposition activists posted a hashtag "Putin, who are you? Come on, get out of here" (#путинтыктотакойдавайдосвидания), inspired by a meykhana in the Astara region of Azerbaijan ("Ty kto takoy? Davay, do svidaniya!"). It became an internet meme and made worldwide trends. In June 2012, Russian rapper Timati with other rappers made a diss track "Davaydosvidaniya" about Philipp Kirkorov after sampling from this song.

== Notable performers ==
- Vugar Abdulov
- Mashadibaba Aydamirov
- Aghasalim Childagh
- Rashad Daghly
- Agshin Fateh
- Elshan Khazar
- Aydin Khirdalanly
- Balaali
- Bayram Kurdakhanly
- Namig Mana
- Namiq Garachukhurlu
- Nizami Ramzi

== See also ==
- Flyting
- Mugham
- Music of Azerbaijan
- Ty kto takoy? Davay, do svidaniya!
