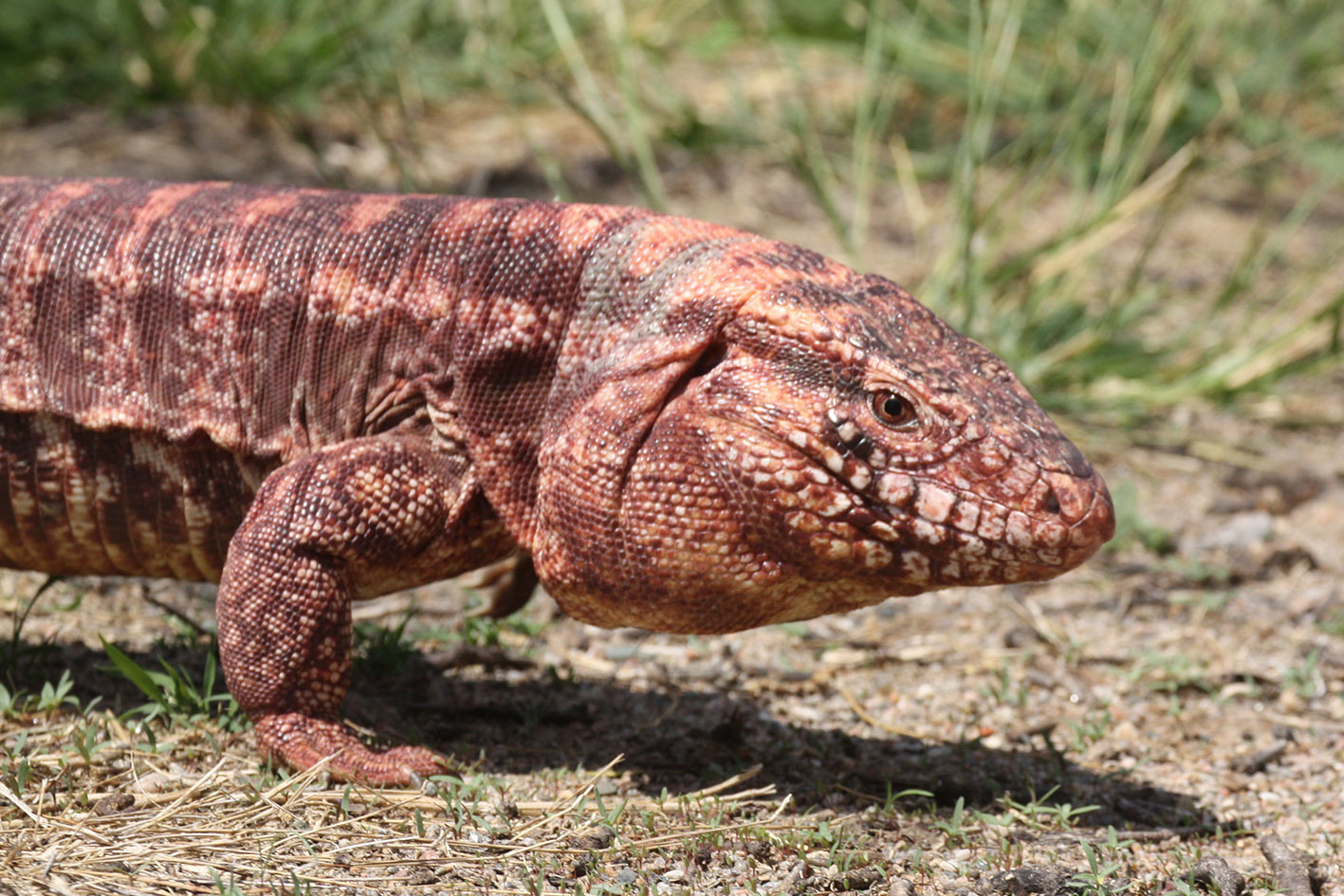
- In Argentina

Conservation status
- Least Concern (IUCN 3.1)
- CITES Appendix II (CITES)

Scientific classification
- Domain: Eukaryota
- Kingdom: Animalia
- Phylum: Chordata
- Class: Reptilia
- Order: Squamata
- Family: Teiidae
- Genus: Salvator
- Species: S. rufescens

Binomial name
- Salvator rufescens (Günther, 1871)

Synonyms
- Teius rufescens Günther, 1871; Tupinambis rufescens Boulenger, 1885

= Red tegu =

Species of lizard

The red tegu (Salvator rufescens) is a lizard native to western Argentina, Bolivia and Paraguay. It is sold in the pet trade around the world due to its ease of care and relatively docile nature.

== Description ==
As hatchlings, most red tegus display little, if any, red coloration. The red tegu grows rapidly, typically reaching maturity in two to three years. It is not uncommon for well-fed juveniles to experience growth spurts of more than an inch per week. They are typically brownish-green with black strips across their width and several broken white stripes down their length. They develop red coloration as they mature; males are usually brighter than females. Adult females can reach 91 cm (just under 3 ft) in length. Males are significantly larger, reaching up to 140 cm (4.5 ft) and developing large jowls.

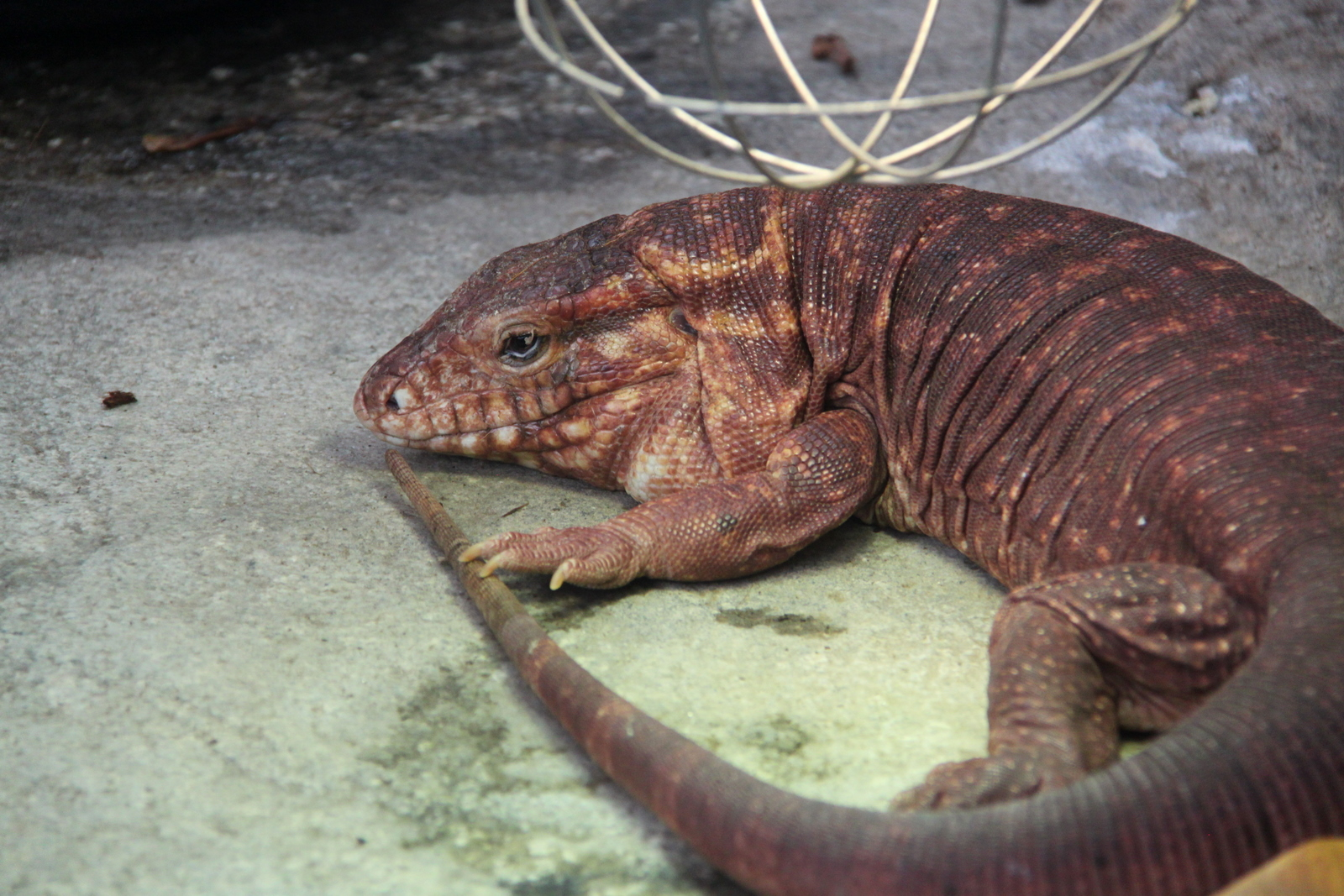

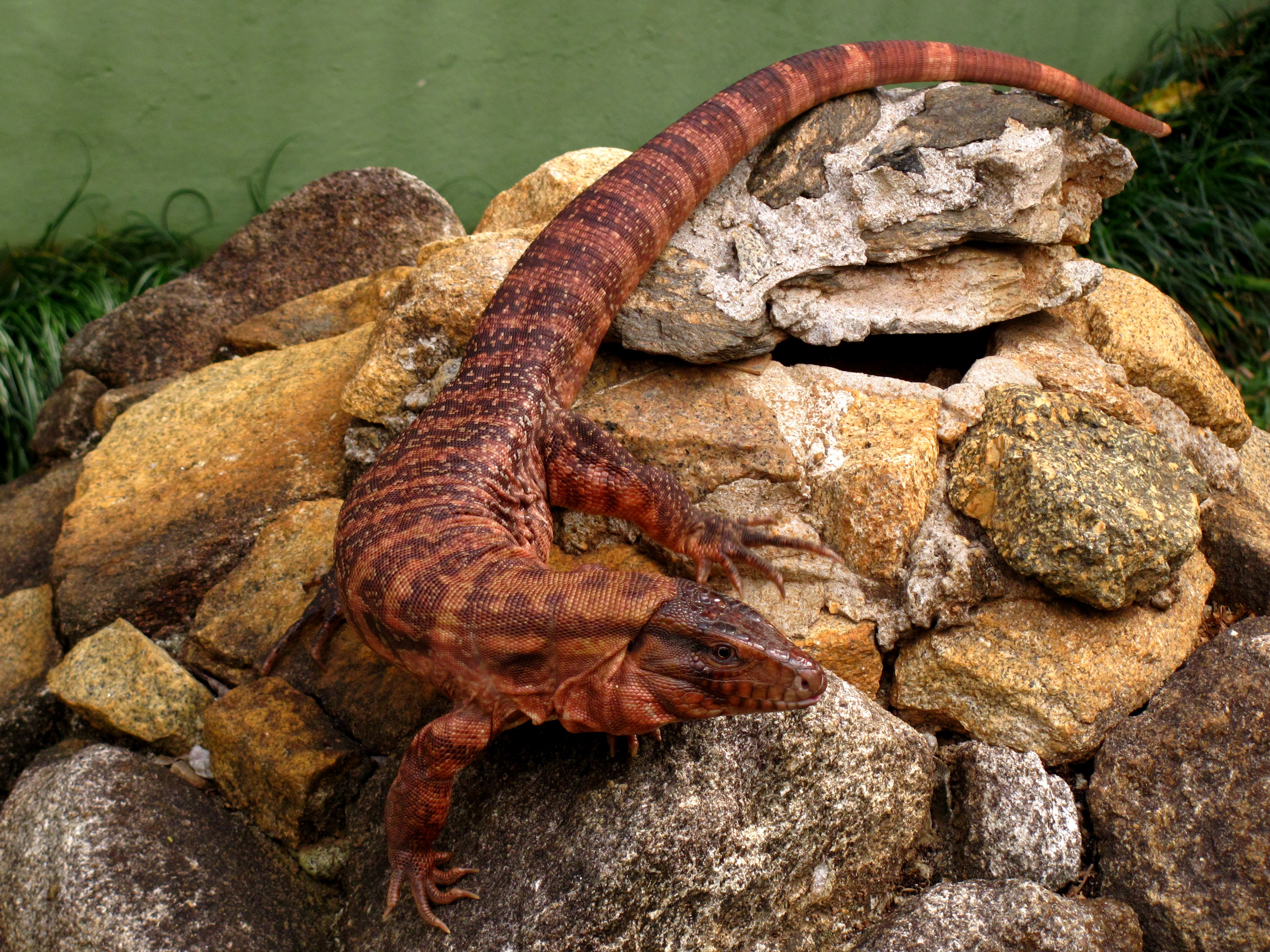

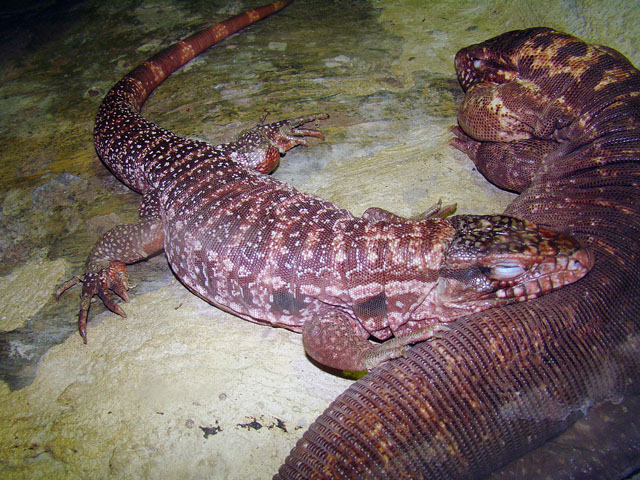
Female (center) and male (right) resting

== Behavior ==
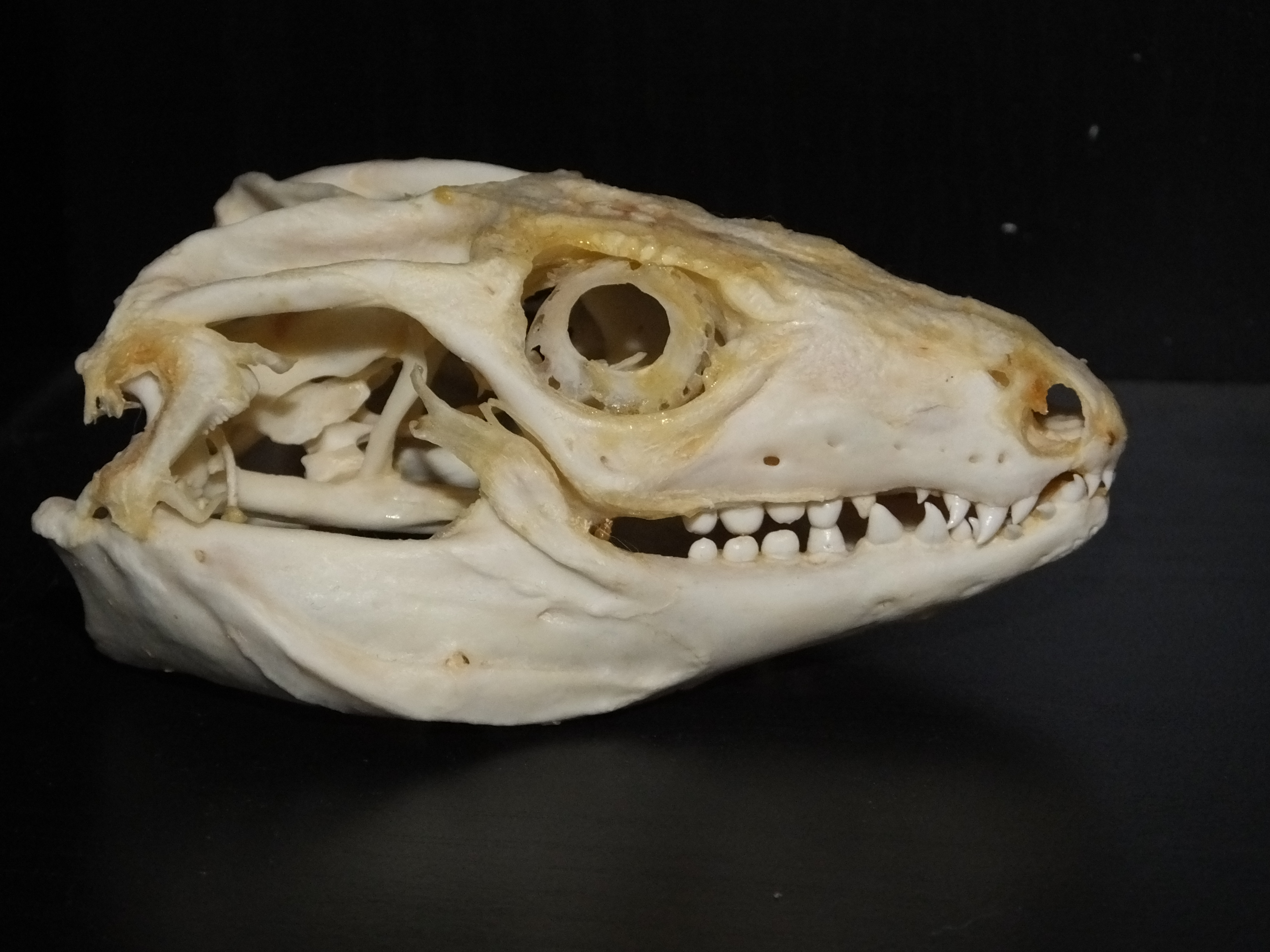
Skull

In the wild, red tegus are diurnal and terrestrial. Living in a temperate climate in Argentina, they brumate in the winter, burying themselves and remaining largely dormant during the coldest periods, in some areas for up to seven months. They also burrow as a matter of habit at other times of year.

In the ecotone between the arid Chaco and the Espinal of central Argentina, they are known to naturally hybridise with the Argentine black and white tegu (Salvator merianae) with a stable hybrid zone.

=== Diet ===
The red tegu is a very opportunistic feeder. Wild specimens will eat a variety of plant and animal matter: fruits, vegetables, insects, rodents, birds, and fish. Red tegus raised in captivity will often be more picky eaters, especially as juveniles, and may prefer a diet of mostly meat.

Being omnivores, red tegus will eat a diverse range of foods, with a focus on animal protein, including small to medium rodents, birds, many insects, and any dead animal they can scavenge.

== Captivity ==
These reptiles are common in the exotic pet trade due to their mostly docile nature. Red tegus in captivity can be known to live up to 15–20 years. They can be trained with clickers and are known for following their owners around the house "like a dog". MacGyver the Lizard is a famous example of one such red tegu.

== Reproduction and Research ==
Red tegus have been shown to be valuable model organisms in studies on reproductive biology. A 2016 study found that males exhibit a trade-off between investment in secondary sexual traits, seasonally, such as enlarged jaw muscles used in mate competition, and post-copulatory sperm characteristics.
