= Aliagha Vahid =

Azerbaijani poet

Aligha Vahid Əliağa Vahid
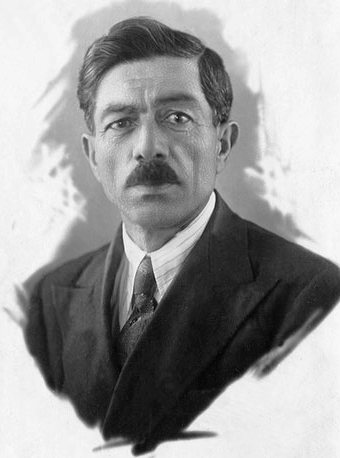
- Born: 17 February 1895; Masazyr, Baku uezd, Baku Governorate, Caucasus Viceroyalty, Russian Empire
- Died: 1 October 1965 (aged 70); Baku, Azerbaijan SSR, Soviet Union
- Occupations: Poet, Ghazal Singer
- Writing career
- Notable work: Mollakhana
- Literary movement: Gazal

Aliagha Mammadgulu oghlu Isgandarov (Azerbaijani: Əliağa Məmmədqulu oğlu İsgəndərov; 17 February 1895, in Baku – 1 October 1965, in Baku), was an Azerbaijani poet and Honoured Artist of the Azerbaijan SSR (1943). He was known for reintroducing medieval ghazal style in Soviet Azerbaijani poetry.

== Life and creativity ==
Aliagha Vahid was born on February 17, 1895 in a family of a carpenter. From his earliest years, he worked as an unskilled laborer and helped his father. His received his first education in madrasa, but not finishing it, entered the literary society “Mejmeush-shuara”. There he befriended such poets as Muniri, Azer Imamaliyev and other popular poets of Baku of that epoch. Under their creative influence, he wrote his first lyrical poems. In his early satirical poems he criticized social deficiencies in the society, superstition and narrow-mindedness, tyranny and unfairness. These poems would enter his first collection of poems titled The Result of Avidity. Later, under the influence of Fuzûlî’s and Seyid Azim’s works, he began to write ghazals. His ghazels were popular among people and that is why he was nicknamed Ghazelkhan.

Wahid greeted the October Revolution and establishment of the Soviet power in Azerbaijan enthusiastically. He actively agitated for the Soviet power in his poems, such as To My Comrade Laborers and Soldiers, What Does the School Mean, Elevate, my angel... and others. In 1924, Wahid got acquainted with Sergei Yesenin, who was living in Baku, in Mardakan village with short breaks. Later, this acquaintanceship turned into a strong friendship. This fact was mentioned in writer-publicist Huseyngulu Najafov’s “May of Balakhany” narrative. After the establishment of the Soviet power and creation of the Azerbaijan SSR he collaborated with “Kommunist” newspaper and the satirical magazine “Molla Nasraddin”. In his collections “Couplets” (1924) and “Mollakhana” (1938) he used satire to criticise opponents of the new system. Battle Ghazels (1943) and Ghazels (1944), the books written during the Great Patriotic War, tackled love to the Motherland, hatred for the enemy and faith in victory.

Being the follower of Fuzuli's literary tendencies, Aliagha Vahid was an eminent representative of the gazel genre in the Soviet culture. Aliagha Wahid was also engaged in translation of ghazels of Nizami, Fuzuli, Khaqani and other classics into Azerbaijani language. He is assumed to be the founder of meykhana, the modern genre of ghazel.

Aliagha Vahid died on the night of 30 September 1965 in Baku and was buried in the Alley of Honor.

== Memory ==
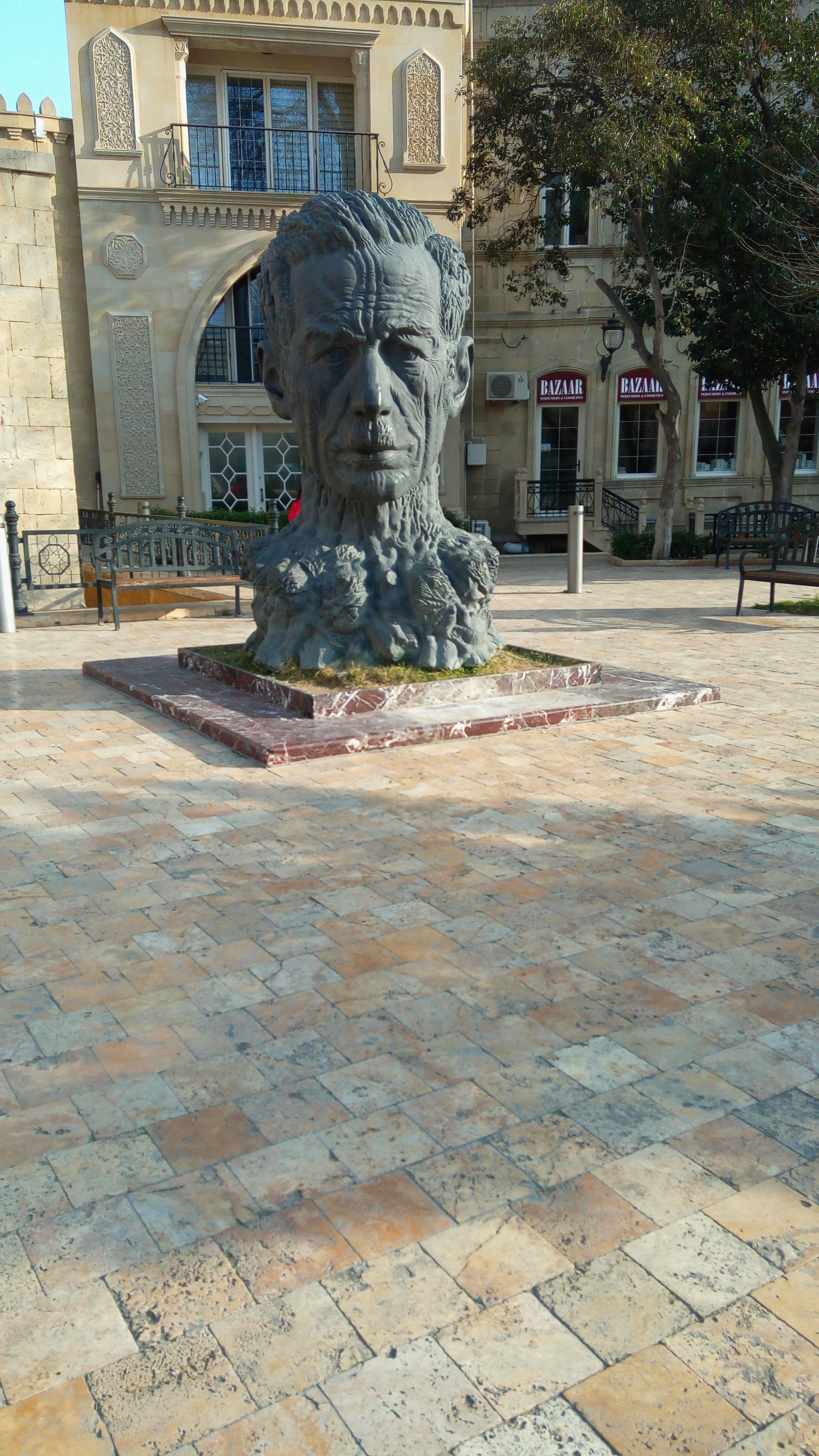
Aliagha Vahid's monument in Old City, Baku.

- A school, park, garden (former Gubernatorial garden), house of literature and a street in Baku were named after Aliagha Vahid.
- A large 1990 bronze bust of Vahid, incorporating allegorical figures into his hair, stands in a small garden area of Baku's Old City just behind the metro station of the same name. It was moved to that location in 2009, having previously sat in the gardens of the Azerbaijan State Philharmonic Hall, on the south side of the city walls.
- In 1991, a film titled Ghazelkhan, dedicated to Vahid's life and creativity, was shot at the film studio Azerbaijanfilm.
