= Unexpected John Cena =

Internet meme

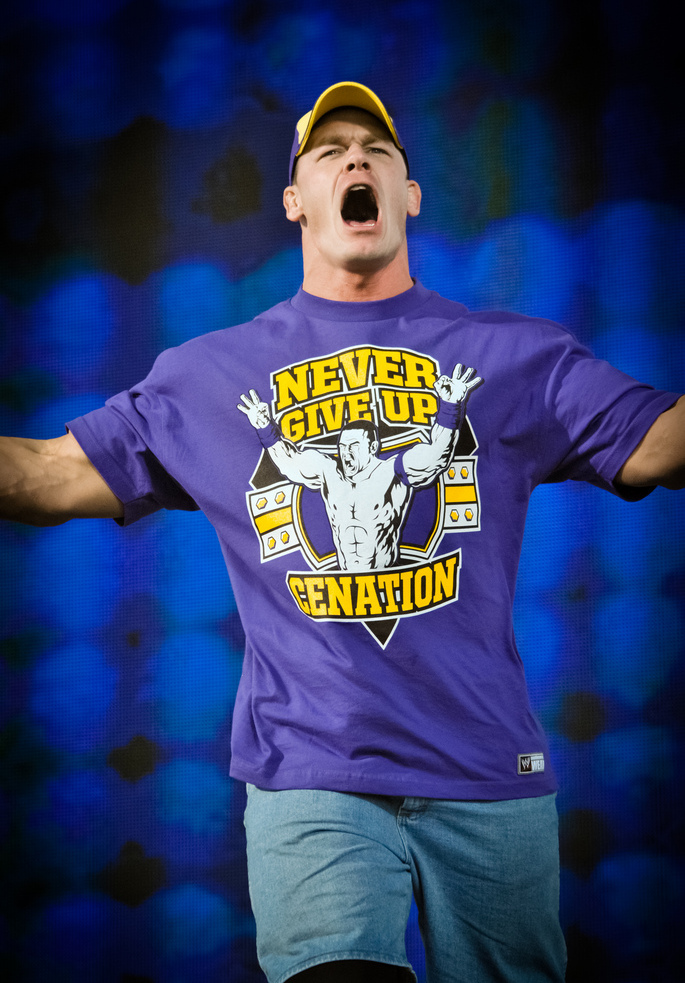
John Cena in 2010

Unexpected John Cena, also known as simply Unexpected Cena or And His Name is John Cena, refers to an Internet meme and a form of trolling involving videos that first garnered popularity on video-sharing services such as Vine and YouTube in late 2015. The meme was born and inspired by numerous prank calls done on Norfolk, Virginia radio station WNVZ's Z Morning Zoo show in 2012. The clips, noted by one writer to symbolize frustration of fans of WWE regarding American wrestler John Cena's over-publicity, depict a snippet of a popular film, TV series, song or other form of media that gets interrupted by Cena's entrance video, as an announcer yells "And his name is John Cena!", or simply "John Cena!", and his theme song "The Time Is Now" plays, often loudly. The meme was very well received by journalists and Cena himself.

== Origins and analysis ==
Unexpected John Cena was inspired by a series of telemarketing prank calls aired on the Z Morning Zoo show in 2012 in which the host repeatedly calls an increasingly aggravated woman to try to convince her to buy WWE "Superslam" (an erroneous name for WWE's annual August pay-per-view SummerSlam). At one point, the Morning Zoo hosts pose as callers from the U.S. Marine Corps to deceive the woman into another surprise telemarketing prank, stating that a former Marine needs her support before shouting: "And his name is John Cena!". Throughout the false telemarketing calls, Cena's well-known theme song "The Time Is Now" is played, even over the woman's protests and threats against the hosts. The host also yells out Cena's name on occasion. The Unexpected Cena videos revolve around building suspense leading to a surprise intrusion of Cena's entrance video and theme song, the volume of which is often drastically increased. The meme generally takes jab at his over-publicity and inserts it into an unrelated situation as a scene stealer.

Since his first time winning the WWE Championship at WrestleMania 21 in 2005 by defeating John "Bradshaw" Layfield (JBL), Cena has gone on to become one of the most popular wrestlers of all time and a poster boy of the WWE. This status led to him gradually becoming a polarizing figure among wrestling fans over the years due to his seemingly limited set of moves (often referred to as the "Five Moves of Doom") and constant portrayal as a Superman-like character, with him often overcoming virtually impossible odds to pick up victories.

As one journalist wrote, "some have chosen a short, but sweet, route, while others have been incredibly elaborate in their surprise." David D. of the blog Uproxx considered it to be the highest degree of rickrolling given how "incredibly obnoxious" the theme song is when it is played out of nowhere during a clip, but also called it a knock-off of the parts in WWE Slam City where John Cena and his theme song are also sometimes presented at an unexpected moment. The meme has also been labeled in the same veins as those of Dragon Ball Z, Shrek and Randy Orton's "[RKO] from outta nowhere" Vines.

== Popularity ==
Unexpected Cena videos were first uploaded to sites such as YouTube, Vine and Twitter and became popular around the summer of 2015, leading to coverage of the meme in publications such as Sports Illustrated and Uproxx. Several comedy websites made lists about Unexpected Cena, such as an article published on the Smosh official site listing the twenty-two best videos of the meme and Dorkly's "15 Reasons Why John Cena Became The Internet's Perfect Meme". The meme was very well-received from journalists, including one who wrote: "the Internet knows how to preserve a joke's sanctity by not overexposing it to the point that you want to shoot yourself in the face". A video by the Fine Brothers showing several YouTube personalities reacting to clips of the meme was done as part of their YouTubers React series.

Films such as Spider-Man, the Star Wars franchise, Ghostbusters, Titanic, Inside Out, television series such as Dora the Explorer, Blue's Clues, Power Rangers, Dragon Ball Z, Breaking Bad and even footage of other WWE/AEW wrestling matches have been used to make the articles. Stages have been made in Super Mario Maker based on the meme. The exposure of Unexpected Cena expanded into offline culture; a video was uploaded to Spotify showing a club DJ playing Eminem's "My Name Is" before he abruptly played the meme, and college students also made signs based on his famous sayings that they showed while on camera for ESPN Radio's show ESPN Radio College GameDay. A writer for the International Business Times felt that the Unexpected John Cena would help the WWE in their struggles with transitioning to digital media given Cena's increased internet popularity from the meme.

John Cena has expressed gratitude for the online phenomenon in interviews, feeling proud for at least being "accepted" by others as a popular culture figure. The WWE made their own Unexpected Cena video compiling the wrestler's most remembered moments of him interrupting matches. This time, however, the Z Morning Zoo host announcing his name is replaced with Jim Ross doing so, and the volume of the song is toned down, which a writer felt did not get the humor of the meme. On June 29, 2016, Cena and Cricket Wireless brought the meme and article to life by surprising many of his fans during a real audition, featuring Bo Dallas and Summer Rae.

This right here is the litmus test. Because I'm kind of aware of what's going on, and I'm fascinated with pop culture, and you can't dictate pop culture. So when pop culture is kind enough to let you in, exploit you, and in a lot of cases make fun of you, and you're just gonna be the vehicle to push this new gag, I totally embrace it. Whether it's in praise or total humor, I don't care. Just to be accepted at this point in my career, I think it's pretty special. At the end of the day, I am overwhelmingly honored to interrupt such historic events.

— Cena in an interview by GQ
