= Ty kto takoy? Davay, do svidaniya! =

Azerbaijan viral video in Russian, Azerbaijani and Talysh

External videos
- Original video

"Ty kto takoy? Davay, do svidaniya!" (Russian: Ты кто такой? Давай, до свидания!, meaning "Who are you? Take off, goodbye!" and other variants of translation) is a title of the viral video, showing meykhana performance with repeating hook in Russian: "Ty kto takoy? Davay, do svidaniya!" by two brothers Intigam and Ehtiram Rustamov from Azerbaijan. The video was filmed on 5 November 2011 at a wedding in Tangarud, Azerbaijan and as of August 2024 it was viewed over 25 million times on YouTube. It is sung in the form of flyting between Talysh and Baku groups in Azerbaijani, Talysh and Russian languages. The video was also viewed over 10 million times at theinstv, the YouTube channel of Insanity TV. The expression is an emphatic way to say "I don't want to know you, go away".

== Political references ==
The hook itself was used particularly by the Russian Car Owners Federation official Andrey Filin, who had written on Twitter: "Tomorrow I'll hang a sign on my car: 'Putin, who are you? See you, goodbye'. I'll make people smile".

Filin's phrase "Putin, who are you? Come on, goodbye" was in turn propagated by the press secretary of Ilya Ponomarev and by the Russian art group Voyna. The Russian hashtag #путинтыктотакойдавайдосвидания ("Putin, who are you? Come on, goodbye") began spreading in Twitter on 29 May 2012 and entered Twitter's worldwide trends the next day. The phrase "Who are you? See you, goodbye" later appeared on picket banners in Russia.

In August 2012, a group of Georgian opposition members used the phrase "Ty kto takoy? Davay, do svidaniya!" targeting president Mikheil Saakashvili in a performance of their own, which they sang in Georgian and released online. The phrase addressed to the Hungarian government was used on placards posted around Yerevan, Armenia during a protest at the Consulate of Hungary on 1 September 2012, upon the extradition of officer Ramil Safarov, who had been convicted by a Hungarian court for murdering his Armenian counterpart in 2004.

== Media references ==
The hook "Ty kto takoy? Davay, do svidaniya!" has been repeatedly remixed and was sampled for dubstep and tech house mashup. Russian rapper Timati sampled the hook for his diss song against Philipp Kirkorov, with participants fashioning the dress style and locale of the original video. "Ty kto takoy? Davay, do svidaniya!" is also the subject of one of the sketches of Russian Lego Life Show on YouTube. The phrase also influenced an article on the Russian sports news website Sportbox, which wrote about the "unpleasing list with trendy title "Who are you? See you, goodbye!" in connection with the group stage of UEFA Euro 2012. The phrase "Who are you? See you, goodbye!" was also uttered by Russian sportcaster Viktor Gusev during a Euro 2012 match between Sweden and Ukraine.
