= School NAD-UQAC =

University campus in Montreal, Canada

School of Digital Arts, Animation and Design
- École des art numériques, de l'animation, et du design
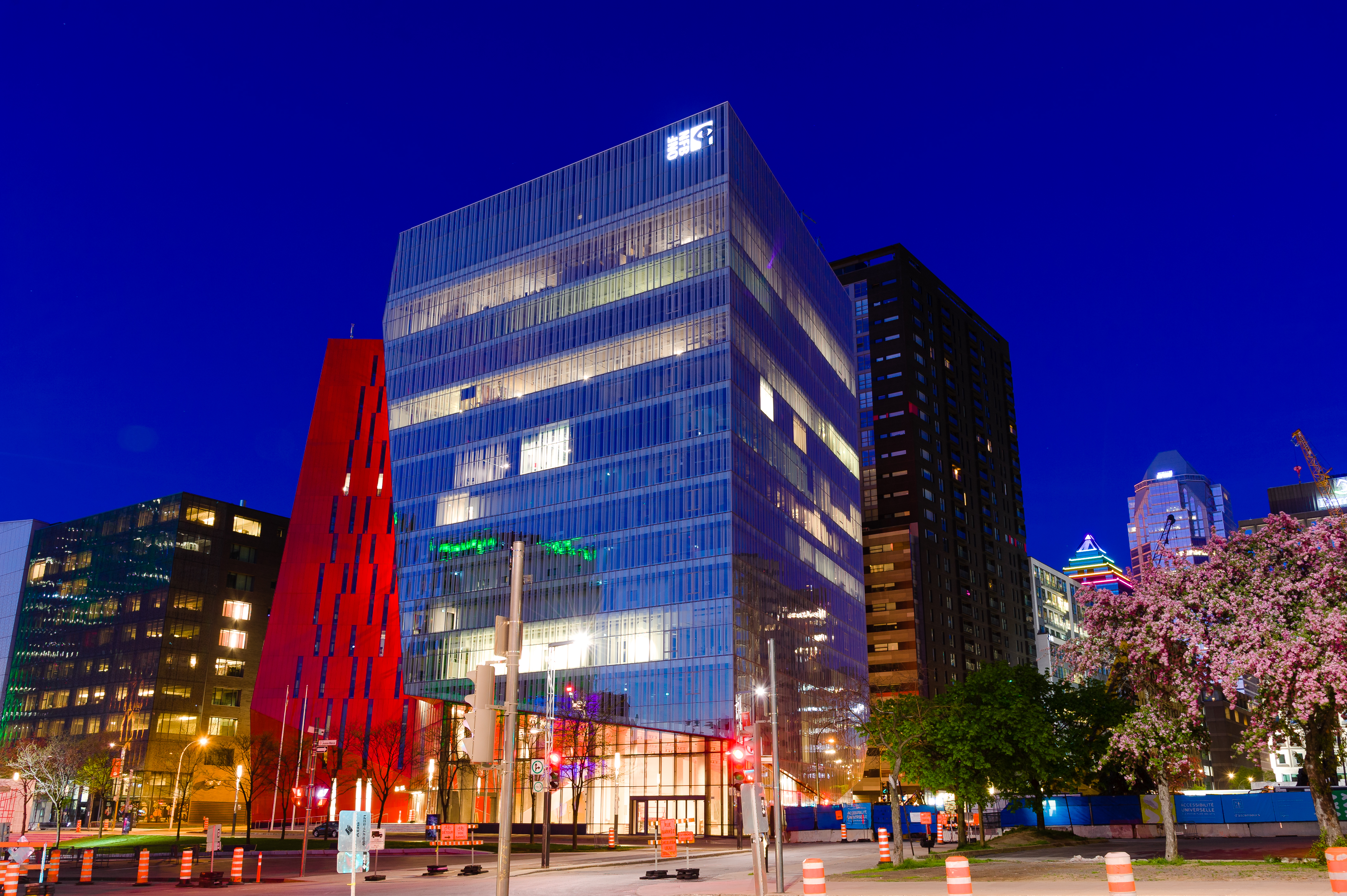
- Other names: NAD, École NAD, École NAD-UQAC, NAD-UQAC
- Former name: Centre NAD
- Type: Public
- Established: 1992
- Academic affiliations: UQAC
- Director: Christian Beauchesne
- Students: 400
- Location: Îlot Balmoral, 1501 rue de Bleury, Montreal, H3A 0H3, Canada; 45.5295750730593°N 73.56878062627031°W
- Campus: Urban
- Language: French
- Colours: Orange
- Website: nad.ca

The School of Digital Arts, Animation and Design at the University of Quebec at Chicoutimi (École des arts numériques, de l'animation et du design de l'Université du Québec à Chicoutimi, often referred to as École NAD or École NAD-UQAC) is a university campus in Montreal, Canada, offering academic programs and research in 3D animation, visual effects, design and digital arts.

For over 25 years, École NAD educated thousands of 3D animators working for companies around the world in different industries (or various sectors): film, television and video games. As one of the oldest 3D animation and VFX schools in the Quebec province, it has trained over 2000 students worldwide in the past two decades.

== The School ==
Founded in 1992 by Cégep de Jonquière, the school was formerly called Centre national d'animation et de design (or Centre NAD) and originally a private institution giving college training in 3D computer graphics. This center notably developed the first course content authorized by Softimage.

Since 2008, it has become a campus of the University of Quebec in Chicoutimi (UQAC) and was renamed École NAD-UQAC. It has since then offered public undergraduate and graduate programs in 3D animation and digital design.

École NAD-UQAC trains digital artists who, upon graduation, not only work for the cinema and video game industries, but can also work in the simulation industry and wherever three-dimensional representations are needed: medical domain, flight simulation for pilots, architectural visualization, etc. 80% of graduates are employed within 6–12 months of graduation.

Highly involved in Montreal's VFX and game industry, École NAD is partners with film and game companies, such as Rodeo FX, Ubisoft Montréal, Hybride Technologies, etc. NAD participates in many professional activities such as Visual Effects Society and SIGGRAPH chapter activities, MHUG (Montreal Houdini User Group), weekly conferences and reviews by key talent from local companies and instructors.

Starting fall 2019, the campus has moved to the Îlot Balmoral at the heart of Quartier des spectacles in downtown Montreal, sharing the building with the National Film Board of Canada. Together these two organizations occupy more than 2/3 of the space available at the building. With the help of the Ministère de l’Éducation et de l’Enseignement supérieur, UQAC invested $40M out of its budget of $110M into this move, which was one of the biggest investments in the history of the university. The school now possesses 5 production zones, 7 classrooms, one amphitheater and 3 studios, including one green-screen studio, one lighting/photography studio, and one studio for virtual reality and motion capture.

The school was formerly located at 405 Ogilvy Avenue in Parc-Extension.

== University programs and professional formations ==
=== Undergraduate studies ===
NAD offers a 3 years Bachelor of Numerical Arts degree in 3D animation and in digital design consisting of 90 credits. Two concentrations are offered: visual effects for film and television or video game. This program is limited to 64 students by concentration, totaling in a maximum of 128 students per graduating class. Programs are offered in French and open to international students.

The school also offers a short undergraduate 30-credit program for initiation to 3D conceptualization, the Certificate in 3D animation and digital design.

=== Graduate studies ===
The school offers two graduate programs: Specialized Diploma (Diplôme d’études spécialisées – DESS) in Narrative Video Game Design, plus a Master of Arts orientated towards research and development in 3D animation and digital design.

=== Formations and camps ===
NAD gives varied training programs.

The school also regularly offers introductory 3D creation day camps in Montreal for children and teenagers. In partnership with Ubisoft, École NAD-UQAC also gives summer camps at Magog in Quebec.

== International presence ==
Through its partnership with Tianjin University of Technology in China, NAD's VFX courses have been taught to Chinese students since 2012.

NAD-UQAC offers exchange programs in France and Belgium with various European institutions such as ENJMIN, EMCA, HEAJ, HOWEST and Brassard Schools.

== See also ==
- Higher education in Quebec
- List of universities in Quebec
