= Per Karl Hjalmar Dusén =

Swedish civil engineer, botanist and explorer (1855–1926)

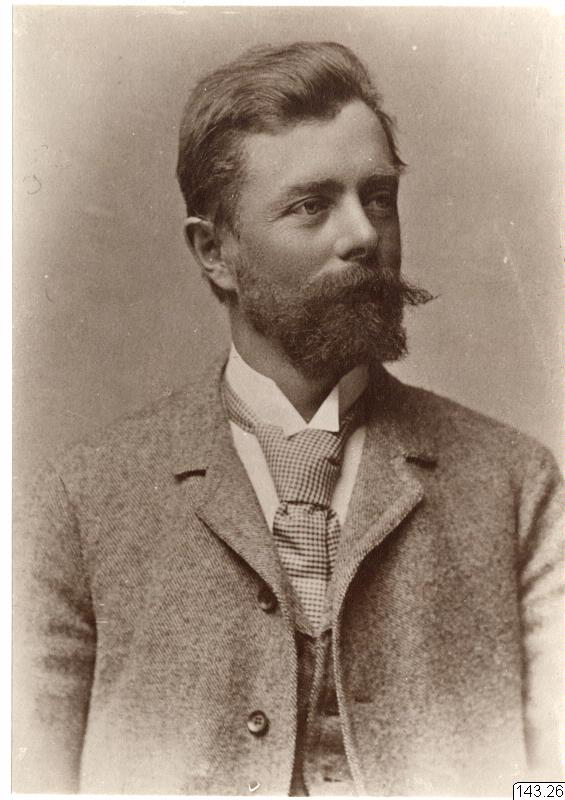
- Per Dusén
- Born: 1855
- Died: 1926 (aged 70–71)
- Citizenship: Sweden
- Scientific career
- Fields: botany
- Author abbrev. (botany): Dusén

Per Karl Hjalmar Dusén (1855–1926) was a Swedish civil engineer, botanist and explorer. As a botanist his interests included pteridology, bryology, and paleobotany. He made botanical expeditions to Africa, Greenland, and South America. During his expeditions to Greenland, he visited Disko Island to catalogue the variety of flowering plants, horsetails and ferns.

Between 1890 and 1892, Dusén collected nearly 560 leaf fossils preserved in basalt in the vicinity of Mount Cameroon on the west coast of Cameroon. Later, these fossils were studied by the German paleobotanist Paul J. Menzel (1864–1927). Dusén edited three exsiccatae devoted to bryophytes, among them one with the title Musci Africani in Camerunia a P. Dusén collecti (1893) and another work with the title Hepaticae Africanae in Camerunia a P. Dusén collectae.

His botanical specimens are at the New York Botanical Garden, being obtained when they acquired the herbarium of Princeton University in 1945.

== Honours ==
More than 200 species were named in his honour, including:

- (Acanthaceae) Acanthus dusenii C.B.Clarke
- (Acanthaceae) Justicia dusenii (Lindau) Wassh. & L.B.Sm. in Reitz
- (Anacardiaceae) Trichoscypha dusenii Engl.
- (Annonaceae) Guatteria dusenii R.E.Fr.
- (Apiaceae) Azorella dusenii H.Wolff
- (Apiaceae) Centella dusenii Nannf.
- (Apiaceae) Trachymene dusenii (Domin) B.L.Burtt
- (Aspleniaceae) Asplenium dusenii Luerss.
- (Teiidae) Salvator duseni Lönnberg, 1910

Dusén Fjord in northeastern Greenland was named in his honour.
