= Maştağa =

Mashtagha
- Municipality
- Azerbaijani: Maştağa
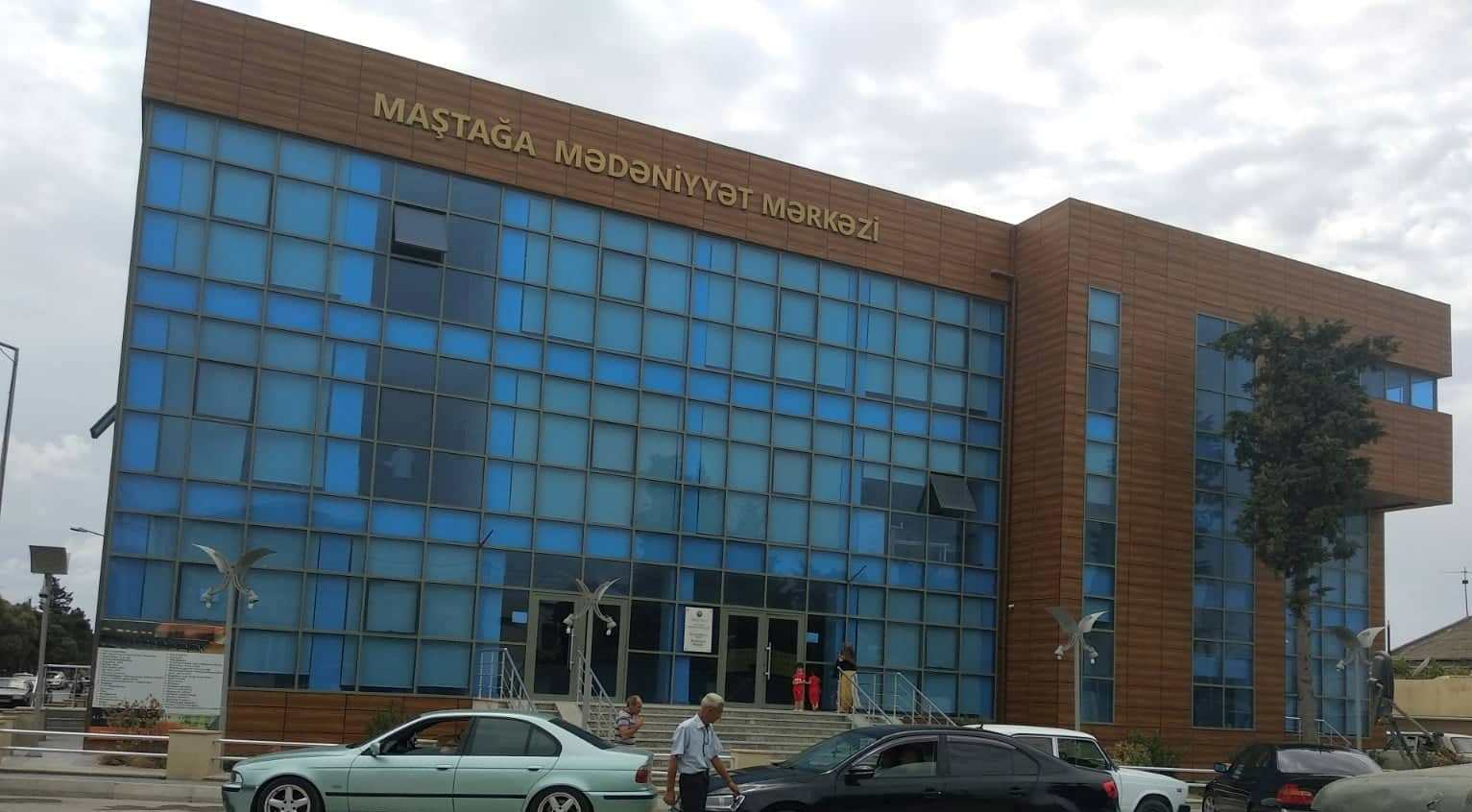
- Mastagha Cultural Center

- Location within Azerbaijan
- Coordinates: 40°31′58″N 50°00′14″E
- Country: Azerbaijan
- City: Baku
- Raion: Sabunchu

Population (2008)
  - Total: 42,196
- Time zone: UTC+4 (AZT)
  - Summer (DST): UTC+5 (AZT)

Maştağa (Mashtagha) is a settlement and municipality in Baku, Azerbaijan. It has a population of 42,196. According to the popular historical manuscripts, the inhabitants of the village are the descendants of an ancient nomadic Turkish tribe which defeated and brought down Cyrus the Great and settled down in Baku during the 5th-6th centuries.

== Climate ==
Climate data for Mashtagha (1971-1990)
Month	Jan	Feb	Mar	Apr	May	Jun	Jul	Aug	Sep	Oct	Nov	Dec	Year
Mean daily maximum °C (°F)	7.0 (44.6)	6.1 (43.0)	9.6 (49.3)	16.8 (62.2)	22.2 (72.0)	27.0 (80.6)	29.9 (85.8)	29.7 (85.5)	26.0 (78.8)	19.2 (66.6)	13.6 (56.5)	9.2 (48.6)	18.0 (64.5)
Daily mean °C (°F)	3.3 (37.9)	3.1 (37.6)	5.3 (41.5)	11.6 (52.9)	16.9 (62.4)	20.7 (69.3)	24.0 (75.2)	23.9 (75.0)	20.1 (68.2)	14.4 (57.9)	9.8 (49.6)	5.8 (42.4)	13.2 (55.8)
Mean daily minimum °C (°F)	1.7 (35.1)	0.9 (33.6)	3.4 (38.1)	7.9 (46.2)	13.0 (55.4)	18.3 (64.9)	21.8 (71.2)	21.6 (70.9)	18.2 (64.8)	12.5 (54.5)	8.1 (46.6)	3.8 (38.8)	10.9 (51.7)
Average precipitation mm (inches)	23 (0.9)	22 (0.9)	25 (1.0)	17 (0.7)	16 (0.6)	5 (0.2)	2 (0.1)	7 (0.3)	17 (0.7)	27 (1.1)	36 (1.4)	27 (1.1)	224 (9)
Average rainy days	6	6	6	4	3	2	1	2	3	5	5	6	49
Mean monthly sunshine hours	80.6	76.3	117.8	195	282.1	300	313.1	285.2	216	145.7	93	93	2,197.8
Mean daily sunshine hours	2.6	2.7	3.8	6.5	9.1	10.0	10.1	9.2	7.2	4.7	3.1	3.0	6.0
Source: NCEI DWD(sun)

== History ==
Mashtagha Village (later transformed into a settlement) with an area of up to 6,000 hectares, which is considered to be one of the largest settlements in Baku, has an ancient history. Here are preserved ancient customs and traditions of Azerbaijan, beliefs and beliefs, mythological imaginations, oral literature.

The village of Mashtagha also confirms its history with its architectural monuments, which have been erected in the history of stone. Since the Middle Ages, 27 baths, 21 houses, defense towers, 20 mosques have been built in the Middle Ages, and its historic territory is rich in large-scale public buildings, leaving it second after Baku. The presence of 5 mosques, 7 baths and 5 ovdans (water wells) in one neighborhood was an exception in Absheron.

It was one of the villages attacked and plundered during Stepan Razin's attacks against the Safavids in 1669.

The word "Mashtagha" appeared before this village itself. The prominent Azerbaijani historian, Abbasgulu Agha Bakikhanov, suggested the idea of the Mashtaga toponym "massaget" in the "Gulustan Ilam". Another meaning of this place was also given to Abbasgulu Agha Bakikhanov as "Mashadi Agha" in "Gulistani-Iram". Baku khanate Mirza Muhammad khan once built a magnificent castle here. There was a mosque next to the tower. It was destroyed in the 1920s. Copper coins were discovered during excavations around the village. Researchers say the village has an ancient history. Mashtagha, which was exposed to the occupation of the invaders, has been repeatedly destroyed.

== Population ==
According to the historical period, this village is likely to be the provincial city in the Middle Ages. Although the first information about the population of Mashtagha originates in the early 19th century, the population of this village was many times higher in the Middle Ages. The number of houses in Mashtagha were 854 in 1849, 1137 in 1886 and 1260 in 1921. The population was 3619 in 1842 and was the number one among the Baku villages in the years to come, but in the years to come, the number was 6179, in 1884 it was 7784, in 1913 it was 8730, in 1926 it was 8220 and In 1939 there were 11642 people. If we did not count the villages belonging to the territory of the mining-factory region in 1913 among the Baku villages, it was still in the first place according to the population. Soviet-era construction work accelerated settlement in the village, where the fastest growing. The population was 16.9 thousand in 1959, 22.2 thousand in 1970, 31.9 thousand in 1979, 40.2 thousand in 1989, 38.9 thousand in 1999, 43.7 thousand per year and 45.1 thousand people in 2016.

== Image Gallery ==
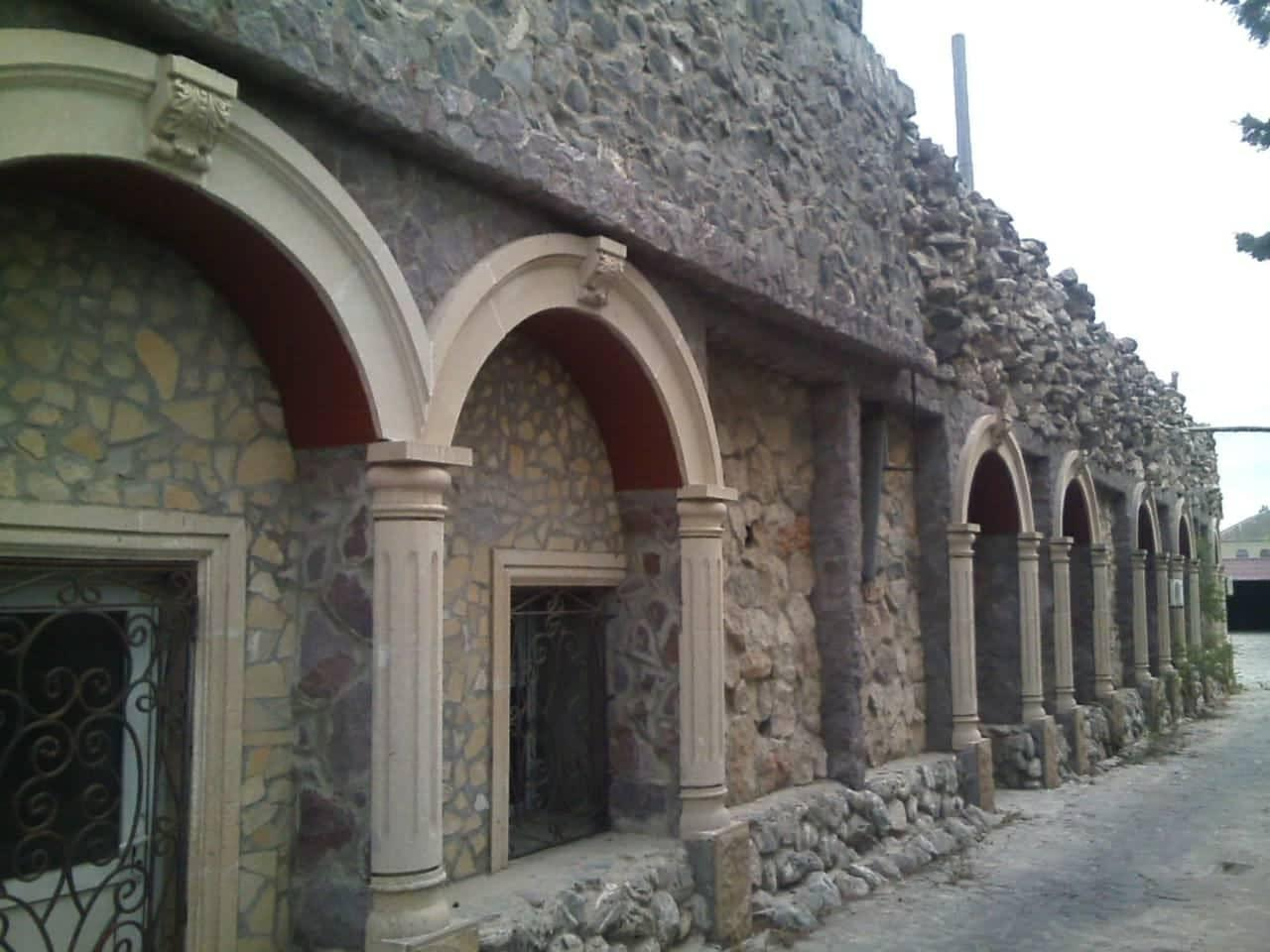
Castle Wall

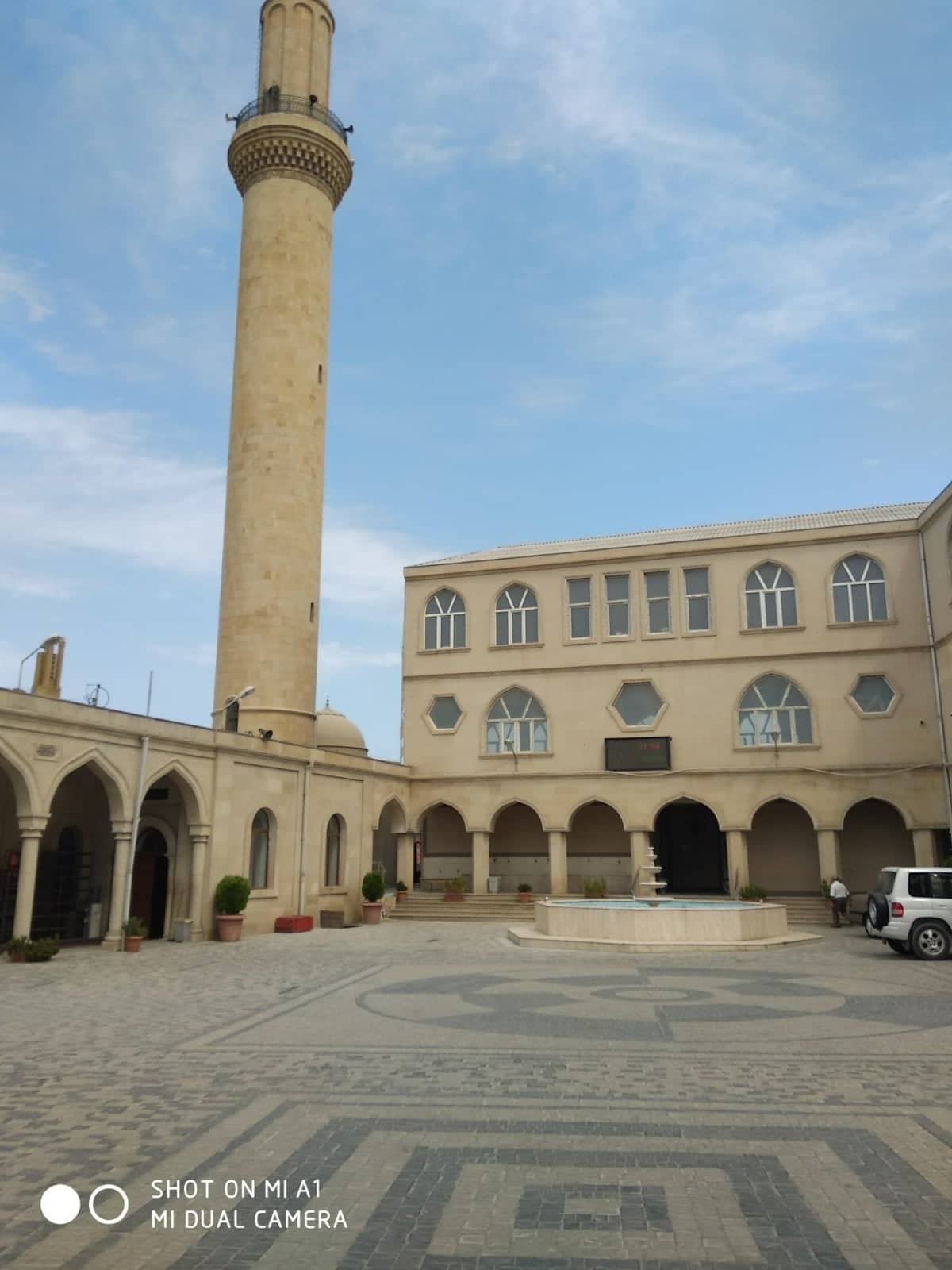
Mastagha Juma Mosque

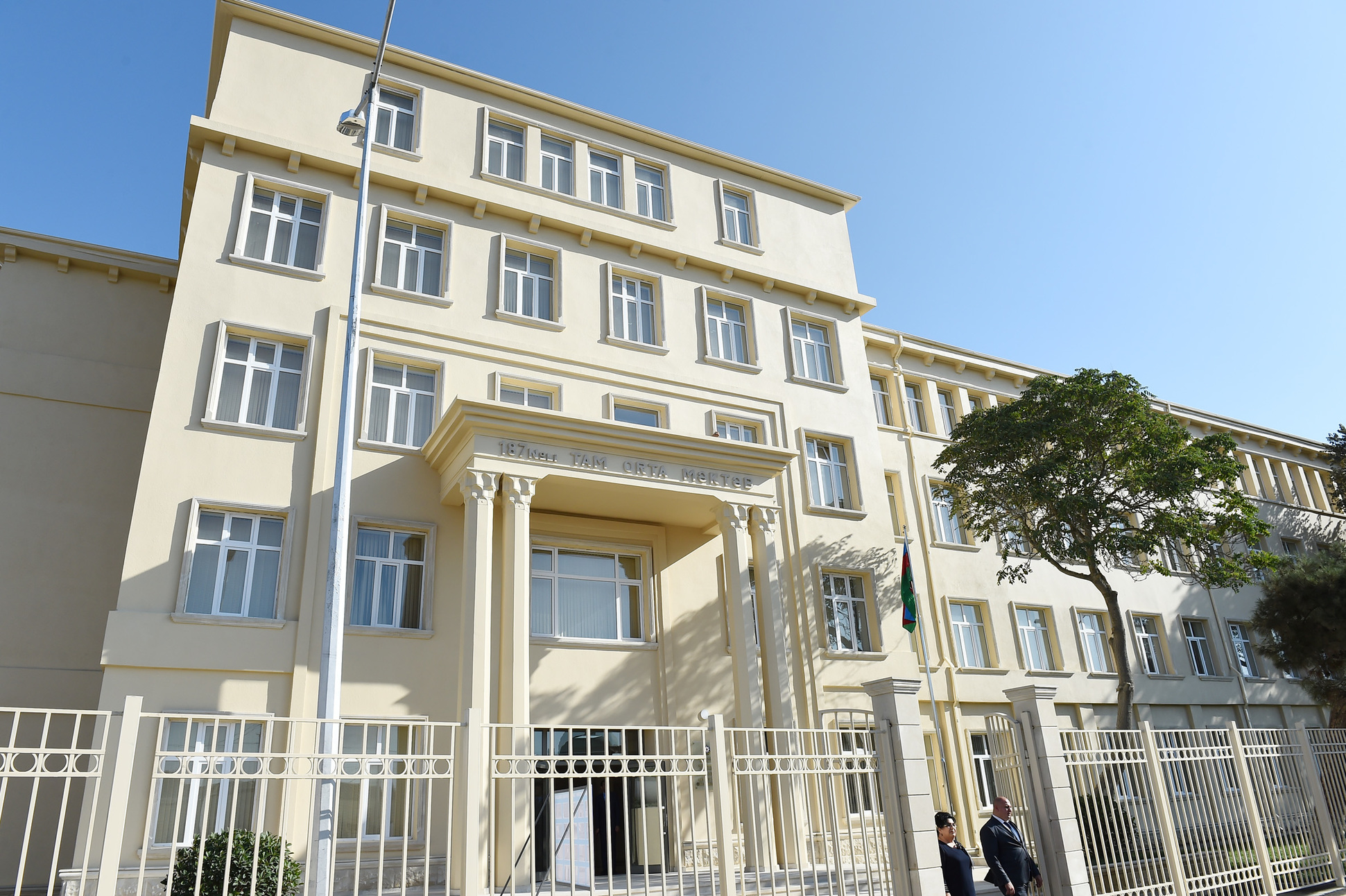
Secondary school No 187 in Mashtagha

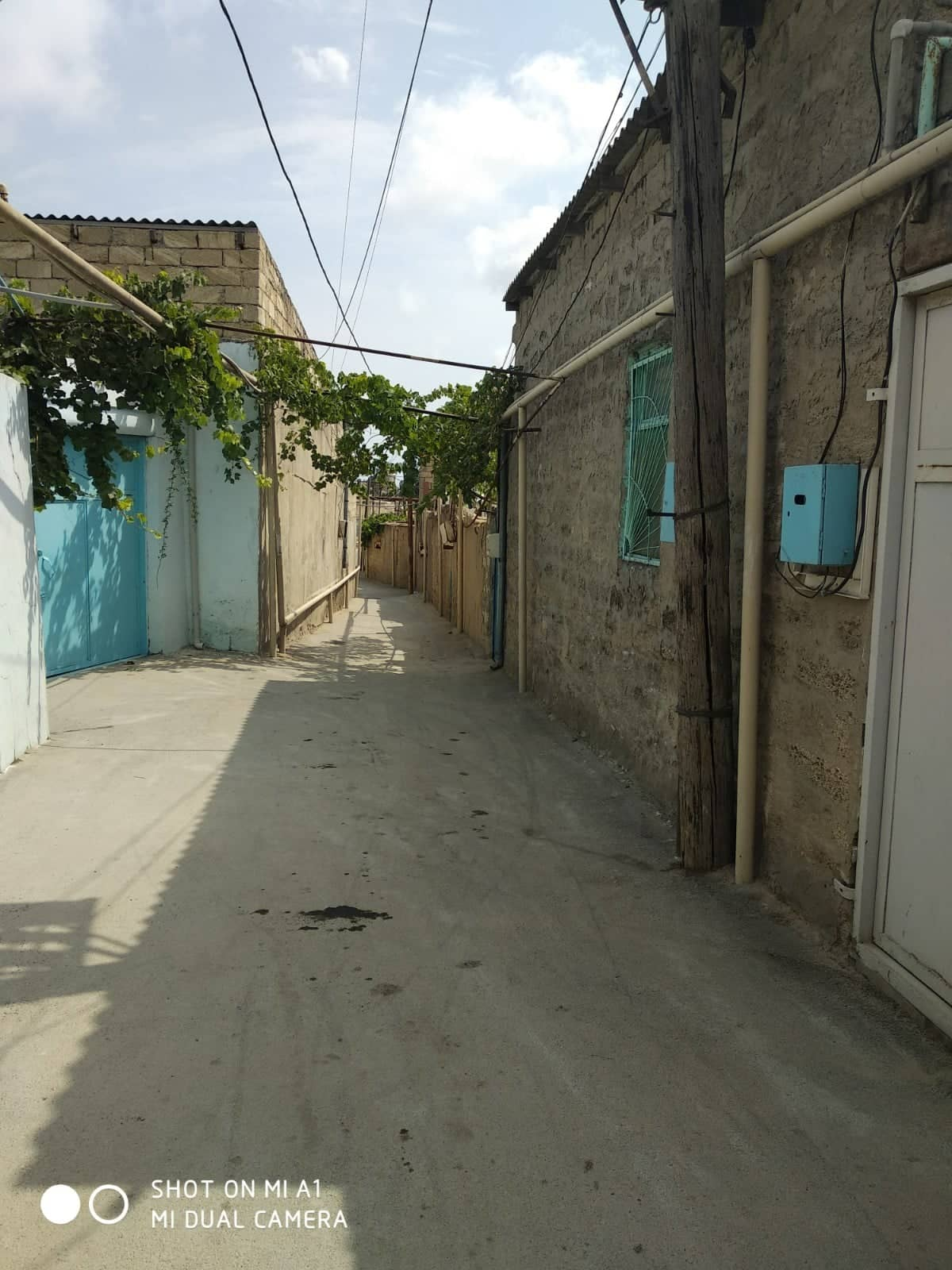
Mashtagha ancient residential neighborhood

== Notable natives ==
- Mammad Mammadyarov — revolutionary, People's Commissar of Social Security of the Azerbaijan SSR (1922–1927).
- Yashar Nuri — People's Artist of Azerbaijan, Laureate of the State Prize of the Republic of Azerbaijan.
