= 2010s =

Decade of the Gregorian calendar (2010–2019)

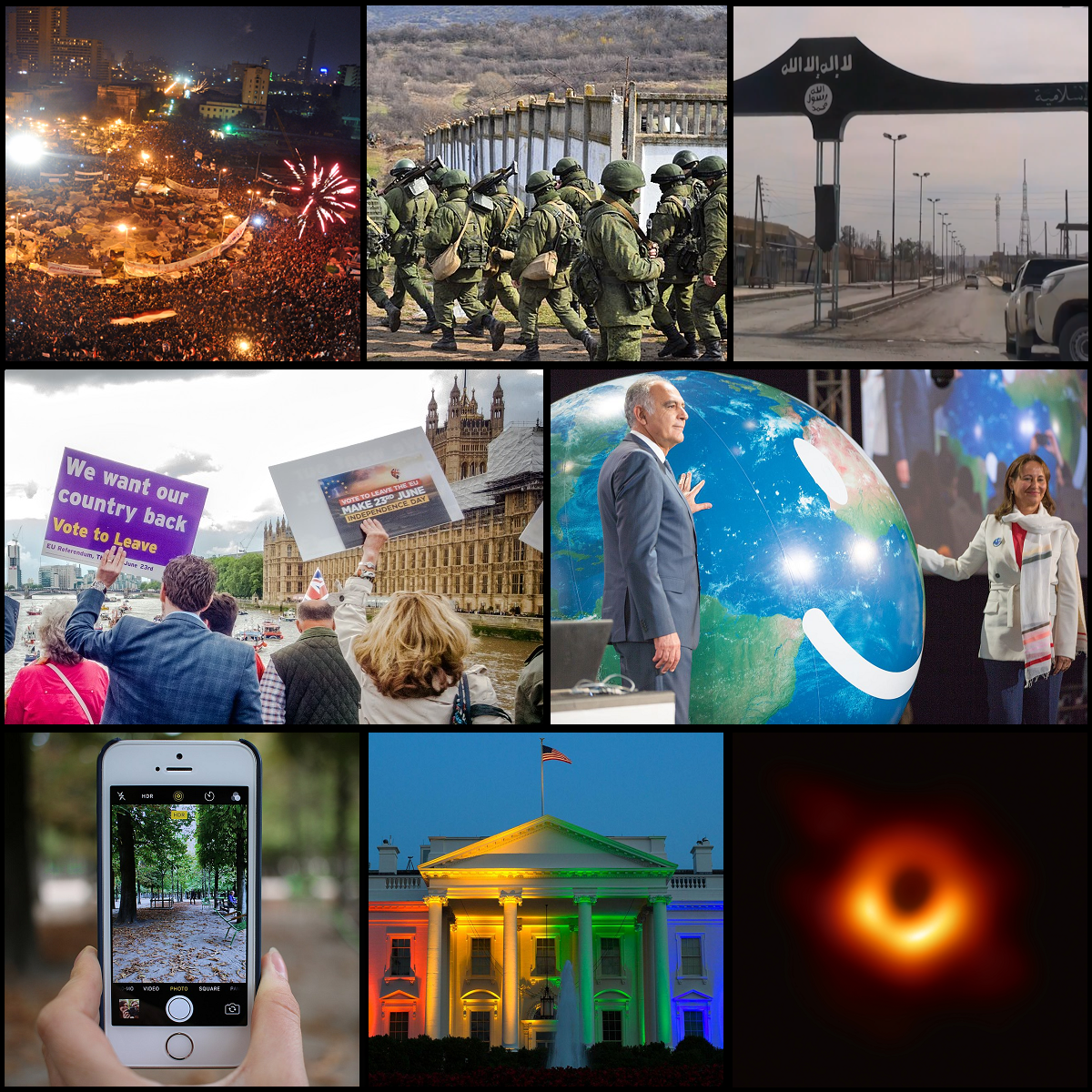
Clockwise from top-left: Anti-government protests called the Arab Spring arose in 2010–2011, and as a result, many governments were overthrown, including when Libyan dictator Muammar Gaddafi was killed; Crimea is annexed by Russia in 2014, starting the Russo-Ukrainian war; The Islamic State perpetrates terrorist attacks and captures territory in Syria and Iraq during the wider Arab Winter; Climate change awareness and the Paris Agreement; The Event Horizon Telescope captures the first image of a black hole in 2019; Obergefell v. Hodges legalizes same-sex marriage in the United States in 2015, marking continuing progress for LGBTQ rights in developed countries; Increasing use of digital media and rise of mobile devices; The United Kingdom votes to leave the European Union in 2016 on a rising tide of populism throughout the decade.

The 2010s (pronounced "twenty-tens" or "two thousand [and] tens"; shortened to "the '10s" and also known as "the tens" or "the teens") was the decade that began on 1 January 2010 and ended on 31 December 2019.

The decade began with an economic recovery from the Great Recession. Inflation and interest rates stayed low and steady throughout the decade, gross world product grew from 2010 to 2019. Global economic recovery accelerated during the latter half of the decade, fueled by strong economic growth in many countries, robust consumer spending, increased investment in infrastructure, and the emergence of new technologies. However, the recovery developed unevenly while many countries autocratized. Socioeconomic crises in some countries—particularly in the Arab world—triggered political revolutions in Tunisia, Egypt, and Bahrain as well as civil wars in Libya, Syria, and Yemen in a regional phenomenon that was commonly referred to as the Arab Spring. Meanwhile, Europe had to grapple with a debt crisis that was pronounced early in the decade. Shifting social attitudes saw LGBT rights make substantial progress throughout the decade, particularly in developed countries.

The decade saw the musical and cultural dominance of dance-pop, electronic dance music, hipster culture and electropop. Globalization and an increased demand for variety and personalisation in the face of music streaming services such as Spotify, SoundCloud and Apple Music created many musical subgenres. As the decade progressed, diversity was also seen with the mainstream success of K-pop, Latin music and trap. Superhero films became box office leaders, with Avengers: Endgame becoming the highest-grossing film of all time. (Note: Avatar (2009) later surpassed Avengers: Endgame as the highest-grossing film of all time following a 2021 re-release in China.) Cable providers saw a decline in subscribers as cord cutters switched to lower cost online streaming services such as Netflix, Amazon Prime, Hulu and Disney+. The video game industry continued to be dominated by Nintendo, Sony, and Microsoft; while indie games became more popular, with Minecraft becoming the best-selling game of all time. Handheld console gaming revenue was overtaken by mobile gaming revenue in 2011. The best-selling book of this decade was Fifty Shades of Grey. Drake was named the top music artist of the decade in the U.S. by Billboard. (Note: Billboard awards are based on album and digital songs sales, radio airplay, streaming, touring and social engagement.)

The United States continued to retain its superpower status while China sought to expand its influence in the South China Sea and in Africa through its economic initiatives and military reforms. It solidified its position as an emerging superpower, despite causing a series of conflicts around its frontiers. Within its borders, China enhanced its suppression and control of Hong Kong, Xinjiang, and Tibet. These developments led the United States to implement a containment policy and initiate a trade war against China. Elsewhere in Asia, the Koreas improved their relations after a prolonged crisis between the two countries, and the war on terror continued as a part of the U.S.'s continued military involvement in many parts of the world. The rise of the Islamic State of Iraq and the Levant extremist organization in 2014 erased the Syria-Iraq border, resulting in a multinational intervention against it. In Africa, South Sudan broke away from Sudan, and mass protests and various coups d'état saw longtime strongmen deposed. In the U.S., celebrity businessman Donald Trump was elected president in 2016 amid an international wave of populism and neo-nationalism. The European Union experienced a migrant crisis in the middle of the decade and withdrawal of the United Kingdom as a member state following the historic United Kingdom EU membership referendum. Russia attempted to assert itself in international affairs, annexing Crimea in 2014. In the last months of the decade, the first cases of the COVID-19 pandemic emerged in Wuhan, China, before spreading to the rest of the world.

Information technology progressed, with smartphones becoming widespread and increasingly displacing desktop computers for many users. Internet coverage grew from 29% to 54% of the world population, and also saw advancements in wireless networking devices, mobile telephony, and cloud computing. Advancements in data processing and the rollout of 4G broadband allowed data, metadata, and information to be collected and dispersed among domains at paces never before seen while online resources such as social media facilitated phenomena such as the Me Too movement, the rise of slacktivism, and online cancel culture. WikiLeaks gained international attention for publishing classified information on topics related to Guantánamo Bay, Syria, the Afghan and Iraq wars, and United States diplomacy. Edward Snowden blew the whistle on global surveillance, raising awareness on the role governments and private entities play in global surveillance and information privacy. Baidu (4th), Twitter (6th) and Instagram (8th) emerged to become among the top 10 most visited websites, while Wikipedia went from the 9th to the 5th most popular website, almost sextupling its monthly visits. Yahoo significantly declined in popularity, descending from being the 1st to the 9th most popular site, with monthly visits declining by two-thirds. Google, Facebook, and YouTube maintained relatively consistent popularity and remained within the top 10 throughout the decade.

Global warming became increasingly noticeable through new record temperatures in different occurrences and extreme weather events on all continents. The CO_{2} concentration rose from 390 to 410 PPM over the decade. At the same time, combating pollution and climate change continued to be areas of major concern, as protests, initiatives, and legislation garnered substantial media attention. The Paris Agreement was adopted in 2015, and the global climate youth movement was formed. Major natural disasters included the 2010 Haiti earthquake, the 2011 Tōhoku earthquake and tsunami, the Nepal earthquake of 2015, the 2018 Sulawesi earthquake and tsunami, the devastating tropical cyclones Bopha (Pablo), Haiyan (Yolanda), and Maria, as well as the 2019 European heat waves.

During the decade, the world population grew from 6.9 to 7.7 billion people. There were approximately 1.4 billion births during the decade (140 million per year), and about 560 million deaths (56 million per year).

== Politics and wars ==
=== Major conflicts ===
The prominent wars of the decade include:

==== International wars ====
Name	Start date	End date	Description
Israeli–Palestinian conflict: 2014 Israel–Gaza conflict	14 May 1948: 8 July 2014	Ongoing: 26 August 2014	Conflict between Jewish and Arab communities in Israel and the West Bank has been ongoing since 1948. After Israel occupied the West Bank, it began making settlements there, which has been an obstacle to the peace process. Tensions also remained high as Hamas, which controls the Gaza Strip, has been launching rockets and cross-border raids into Israeli territory, to which Israel has responded with force.
Nagorno-Karabakh conflict: 2016 Nagorno-Karabakh conflict; 2018 Armenian–Azerbaijani clashes	February 1988: 1 April 2016; 20 May 2018	Ongoing: 5 April 2016; 27 May 2018	The region of Karabakh has been disputed over the Republic of Artsakh, which is supported by the Armenian government. A ceasefire was held in 1994. From 1–5 April 2016, clashes began along the Nagorno-Karabakh line of contact with the Artsakh Defence Army, backed by the Armenian Armed Forces on one side and the Azerbaijani Armed Forces on the other. A ceasefire was reached on 5 April between Azerbaijan and Armenia in Moscow. From 20 to 27 May 2018, clashes in former no man's land in the Nakhchivan Autonomous Republic, an exclave of Azerbaijan, led to Azerbaijan reoccupying Günnüt and several other strategic villages and positions.
War on terror: War in Afghanistan; Iraq war; Drone strikes in Pakistan; American intervention in Somalia; American intervention in Libya	12 September 2001: 7 October 2001; 20 March 2003; 18 June 2004; 7 January 2007; 13 November 2015	Ongoing: 31 December 2016; 18 December 2011; 4 July 2018; Ongoing; 30 October 2019	Motivated by the 9/11 attacks, the United States and other governments started a large scale effort to eliminate terrorism. With support from NATO, the United States invaded Taliban-controlled Afghanistan and overthrew the government. Two years later, on the pretext that the government of Saddam Hussein had weapons of mass destruction, the United States and a coalition of partners invaded Iraq and overthrew Hussein, after which the U.S. occupied the country. However, insurgencies remained active in both countries, long after the invasions.
2011 military intervention in Libya	19 March 2011	31 October 2011	Following United Nations Security Council Resolution 1973, a NATO-led coalition launched an air campaign backing anti-Gaddafi rebels against Muammar Gaddafi's government in the Libyan Civil War.
Russo-Ukrainian War: Annexation of Crimea; War in Donbas	20 February 2014: 20 February 2014; 6 April 2014	Ongoing: 26 March 2014; 24 February 2022	After the fall of Ukrainian president Viktor Yanukovych, Russian soldiers took control of strategic positions in the Ukrainian territory of Crimea and subsequently annexed the region after a controversial referendum. In the months that followed, demonstrations in Donbas escalated into an armed conflict between the government of Ukraine and Russian-backed separatist forces. On 24 February 2022, the war in the Donbas region was subsumed by the Russo-Ukrainian war
War against the Islamic State	13 June 2014	Ongoing	In late 2013, a terrorist organisation called the Islamic State of Iraq and the Levant began making rapid advances and territorial gains in Iraq and Syria. It captured Mosul in June and made Raqqa its capital. Various international coalitions led by the United States, France, Russia, and Muslim states and with aid from dozens of countries were formed to help fight the militants. By December 2017, ISIL had lost all of its territory in Iraq and 95% of its territory in Syria, and was militarily and territorially defeated on 23 March 2019.
Saudi-led intervention in the Yemeni civil war	26 March 2015	Ongoing	During the Yemeni civil war, Saudi Arabia, United Arab Emirates, and other countries invaded parts of Yemen in order to depose the Houthi-controlled government.
Turkish involvement in the Syrian Civil War: Operation Euphrates Shield; Turkish military operation in Idlib Governorate; Operation Olive Branch; 2019 Turkish offensive into north-eastern Syria	5 December 2011: 24 August 2016; 7 October 2017; 20 January 2018; 9 October 2019	Ongoing: 29 March 2017; Ongoing; 9 August 2019; 25 November 2019	During the Syrian Civil War, Turkey invaded parts of northern Syria in order to combat the Islamic State of Iraq and the Levant and the Syrian Democratic Forces, fostering and funding the Syrian National Army of the Syrian Interim Government, culminating in its 2019 offensive into northeastern Syria in which over 300,000 civilians were displaced and dozens more killed, prompting a controversial reaction worldwide in response to reported human rights violations and resettlement of Kurds which has been viewed as possible ethnic cleansing.
2019 India–Pakistan border skirmishes	14 February 2019	22 March 2019	After a suicide car bombing on 14 February 2019 where 40 Indian security personnel are killed, the Indian Air Force launches airstrikes on purported terrorist camps in Muzaffarabad and Chakothi areas of Pakistan-administered Kashmir, and Balakot in mainland Pakistan, leading to said standoff. Jaish-e-Mohammed, a Pakistani militant group that took responsibility for the bombing and the purported target of Indian attacks, was also involved.

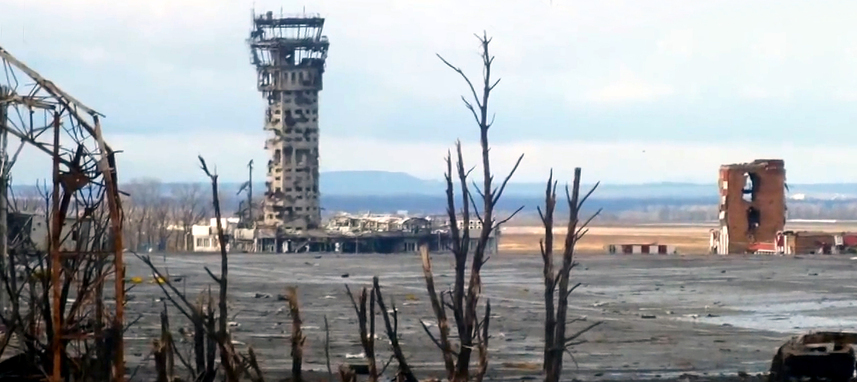
The war-torn ruins of Donetsk International Airport in late December 2014

In red: the area controlled by the Islamic State of Iraq and the Levant (ISIL) proto-state in December 2014

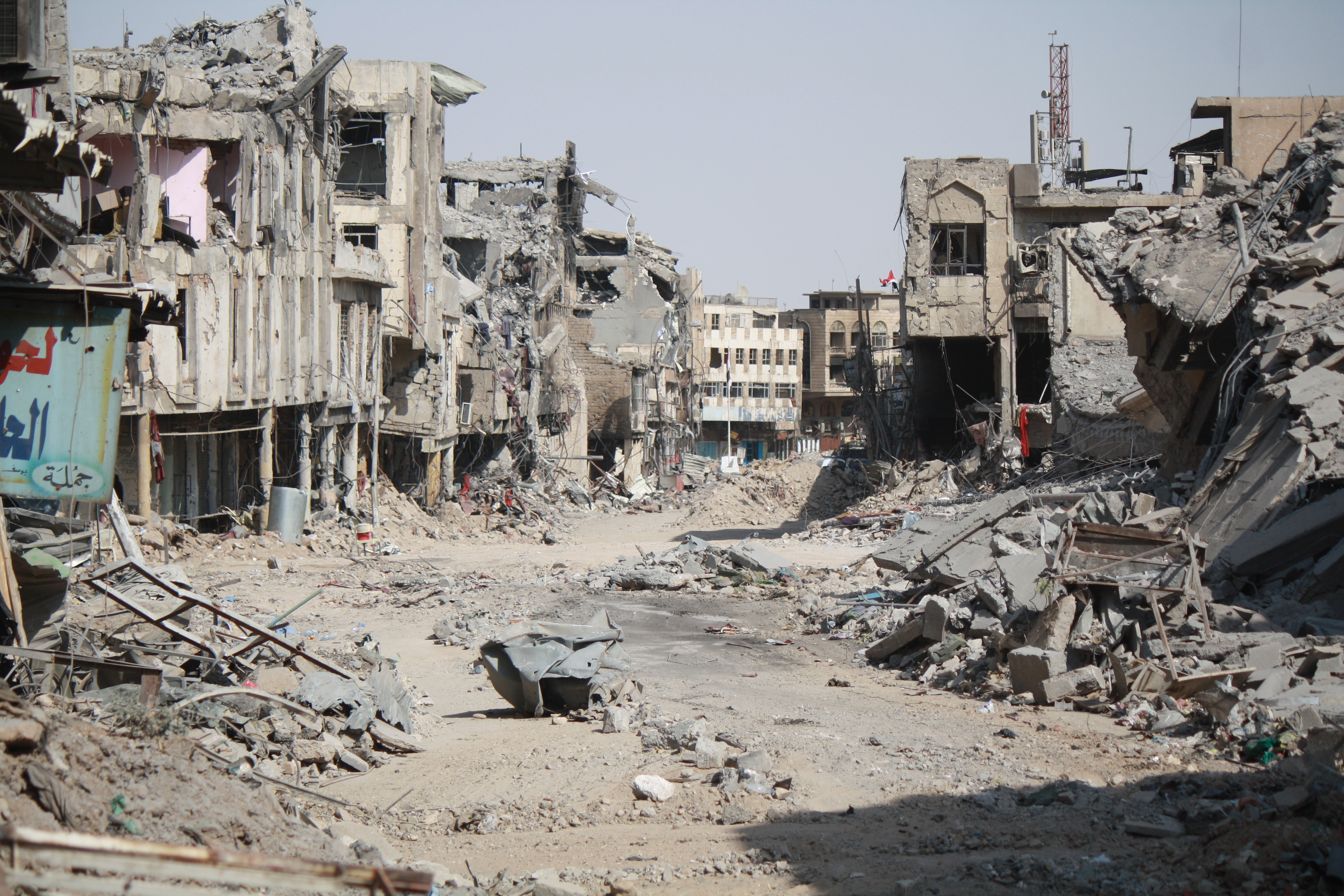
Devastation in Mosul's old city after recapture from ISIL in 2017

==== Civil wars ====
Name	Start date	End date	Description
Colombian Armed Conflict	27 May 1964	Ongoing	Low-intensity conflict between the Colombian government, left-wing guerrillas, and paramilitary factions has been ongoing since 1964. However, at the start of the decade, only two major groups remained, FARC and ELN. Since 2012, both have been in peace talks with the government, with FARC and the government signing a historic ceasefire in June 2016. Though the deal was initially rejected by voters in October, a revised deal was unanimously passed by the Congress in November 2016, bringing an end to much of the fighting.
Insurgency in Khyber Pakhtunkhwa	16 March 2004	Ongoing	Since 2004, Pakistan has been fighting an insurgency by armed militant groups aligned with the Taliban or Islamic State along its border with Afghanistan. The violence has killed at least 60,000 since and over 6 million displaced. By 2014, however, casualties from terrorist and militant attacks had dropped by around 40%.
Insurgency in Paraguay	27 August 2005	Ongoing	Since 2005, Paraguay has been fighting a low-level insurgency by Marxist–Leninist armed militant groups. The conflict is estimated to have caused a cumulative 111 deaths by 2020, most of which have been insurgents, local ranchers, and police officers.
Mexican drug war	11 December 2006	Ongoing	Following a rise in criminal violence as a result of influential drug trafficking in the country, President Felipe Calderón declared a war on drugs in 2006. Since then, violence has sharply increased, with a death toll of nearly 300,000 over 60,000 missing, and 39,000 unidentified bodies in morgues. Arrests of cartel leaders led to increasing violence as cartels, fought for control of trafficking routes into the United States. The conflict has emphasised corruption and human rights abuses, with bribery, drug smuggling, kidnapping, and protection of cartels being widely reported among government officials.
Somali civil war	31 January 2009	Ongoing	In 2009, Al-Shabaab, an Islamist militant group, began waging an insurgency against the newly formed Transitional Federal Government. In 2011, the federal government captured Mogadishu and subsequently retook towns across the country. Since then, the government has attempted to clean out the remaining Al-Shabaab strongholds with help from AMISOM soldiers and military intervention on the part of the United States. Al-Shabaab made a resurgence in 2016, when AMISOM and Kenyan forces were subject to attacks and raids, to which American and Somali forces responded with airstrikes, weakening Al Shabaab's territorial prominence. The conflict has cost 300,000 to 500,000 lives and devastated Somalia's infrastructure and humanitarian resources.
Boko Haram insurgency	26 July 2009	Ongoing	Sparked by long-standing conflict between Nigeria's Christian and Muslim communities, the Boko Haram insurgency began when the jihadist rebel group started a rebellion against the government. In 2015, the group pledged alliance to ISIL, becoming the world's deadliest terrorist group by 2015. The conflict has killed over 37,500 people and displaced 2.5 million, driving 244,000 Nigerian refugees into neighbouring states. Insurgents were weakened in 2015 when Nigerian forces drove them into Sambisa Forest, causing bitter infighting. However, they made a resurgence in 2018–19, with human rights violations; massacres; and mass child kidnappings, exploitation, and torture posing a threat to civilians.
Mali War	16 January 2012	Ongoing	In 2012, a rebellion by Tuaregs in Northern Mali began. After Malian president Amadou Toumani Touré was ousted in a coup, Tuaregs captured Northern Mali, and declared it to be the independent state of Azawad. However, Islamists groups took over Northern Mali from the Tuaregs and imposed sharia law.
South Sudanese Civil War	15 December 2013	22 February 2020	A multi-sided civil war between government and opposition forces including SPLM-IO and other groups. Ugandan troops were deployed to fight alongside the South Sudanese government. The UN deployed peacekeepers as part of the United Nations Mission in South Sudan.
War in Iraq	1 January 2014	9 December 2017	The civil war began with the conquest of Fallujah, Mosul, Tikrit and areas of northern Iraq by Islamic State. Nations provided aid in the form of airstrikes, troops and intelligence. In December 2017, Prime Minister Haider al-Abadi announced victory over ISIL, though others warned to expect ISIL to continue the fight by other means.
Libyan civil war	16 May 2014	24 October 2020	Following the factional violence that engulfed Libya after the fall of Muammar Gaddafi, a second civil war broke out among factions seeking control of the territory and oil of Libya. The conflict was mostly between the House of Representatives (HoR) government that was controversially elected in 2014, also known as the "Tobruk government"; and the rival General National Congress (GNC) government, also called the "National Salvation Government". A permanent ceasefire agreement in all areas became effective from October 2020, ending the war.
Yemeni civil war	16 September 2014	Ongoing	Preceded by a decade-long Houthi insurgency, the Yemeni civil war began between two factions: the then-incumbent Yemeni government and the Houthi militia, along with their supporters and allies. Both claim to constitute the Yemeni government.
Philippine drug war	30 June 2016	Ongoing	There was a rise in criminal violence as a result of drug trafficking, after Philippine President Rodrigo Duterte was inaugurated in 2016. As of 2020, it has caused about 6000 deaths.
Siege of Marawi	23 May 2017	23 October 2017	The battle of Marawi was a five-month-long armed conflict in Marawi, Philippines, that started on May 23, 2017, between Philippine government security forces against militants affiliated with the Islamic State, including the Maute and Abu Sayyaf Salafi jihadist groups. The battle became the longest urban battle in the modern history of the Philippines.
Anglophone Crisis	9 September 2017	Ongoing	Following the suppression of 2016–17 protests by Cameroonian authorities, Ambazonian separatists in the Anglophone regions launched a guerrilla campaign against the Cameroon Armed Forces, and unilaterally proclaimed independence. In November 2017, the government of Cameroon declared war on the separatists and sent its army into the Anglophone regions.
Insurgency in Cabo Delgado	5 October 2017	Ongoing	The insurgency in Cabo Delgado is an ongoing Islamist insurgency in Cabo Delgado Province, Mozambique, fought between militant Islamists and jihadists attempting to establish an Islamic state, and Mozambican security forces. Civilians have been the main targets of terrorist attacks by Islamist militants. The main insurgent faction is Ansar al-Sunna, a native extremist faction with connections to ISIS.
Islamic State insurgency in Iraq	9 December 2017	Ongoing	The insurgency in Iraq is an ongoing low-intensity insurgency that began in 2017 after ISIS lost its territorial control in the War in Iraq, during which ISIS and allied White Flags fought the Iraqi military (largely backed by the United States, United Kingdom and other countries conducting airstrikes against ISIS) and allied paramilitary forces (largely backed by Iran).
Catatumbo campaign	January 2018	Ongoing	The Catatumbo campaign has been an ongoing period of violence between militia faction groups in the Catatumbo region of Colombia and Venezuela since January 2018. It is an extension of the war on drugs and developed after the Colombian peace process of 2016.

=== Revolutions and major protests ===
Successful revolutions and otherwise major protests of the decade include, but are not limited to:

Event	Date	Country	Events	Ref.
2010 Kyrgyz Revolution	6 April – 14 December 2010	Kyrgyzstan	Kyrgyz President Kurmanbek Bakiyev fled Bishkek amid fierce anti-government riots as the opposition seized control.	
Occupy Wall Street and the Occupy movement	September 17, 2011 – c. 2013	United States	Hundreds of protesters marched into the financial district of Wall Street in New York City, beginning the Occupy Wall Street movement.	
Rojava revolution	19 July 2012 – present	Rojava	During the Syrian Civil War, Kurds started to govern a de facto autonomous region known as Rojava, while Turkey and the Islamic State attempt to take the territory back.	
Gezi Park protests	28 May 2013 – 30 August 2013	Turkey	A wave of demonstrations and civil unrest in Turkey began on 28 May 2013, initially to contest the urban development plan for Istanbul's Taksim Gezi Park.	
Euromaidan and the Revolution of Dignity	21 November 2013 – 23 February 2014	Ukraine	Ukrainian President Viktor Yanukovych fled the country following violent protests in the capital, Kyiv. The opposition-controlled Verkhovna Rada voted to remove Yanukovych as president.	
Abkhazian Revolution	27 May – 1 June 2014	Abkhazia	In a quick turn of events, the president of the breakway republic, Alexander Ankvab, was ousted from power after the government building was stormed.	
2014 Burkina Faso uprising	28 October – 3 November 2014	Burkina Faso	A series of demonstrations and riots in Burkina Faso in October 2014. Demonstrations began in response to controversial attempts to introduce a constitutional amendment that would lift term limits and allow President Blaise Compaoré to run for additional terms as president and extend his years in office. On 30 October, Compaoré dissolved the government and fled to Côte d'Ivoire and was succeeded by Yacouba Isaac Zida.	
2015–2016 protests in Brazil	15 March 2015 – 31 July 2016	Brazil	In 2015 and 2016, a series of protests in Brazil denounced government corruption and the presidency of Dilma Rousseff, being the largest popular mobilisations in the country since the beginning of the "New Republic".	
Burundian unrest	26 April 2015 – 17 May 2018	Burundi	Burundi faces unrest as President Pierre Nkurunziza seeks a third term in office, resulting in hundreds killed and thousands more fleeing the country.	
2018–2019 Gaza border protests	30 March 2018 – 27 December 2019	IsraelPalestine	Protests against the Blockade of the Gaza Strip, with 183 protesters killed.	
2018 Armenian Revolution	31 March – 8 May 2018	Armenia	Various political and civil groups led by member of parliament Nikol Pashinyan staged anti-government protests in Armenia. Prime Minister Serzh Sargsyan resigned on 23 April 2018. Nikol Pashinyan was elected prime minister on 8 May 2018.	
2018 Bangladesh road-safety protests	29 July – 1 September 2018	Bangladesh	Nation-wide protests mainly by students after reckless driving caused deaths of two high school students.	
Yellow vests protests	17 November 2018 – 28 June 2020	France	France experiences its worst civil unrest since the protests of 1968 due to the yellow vests movement. Protests in Paris morph into riots, with hundreds of people injured and thousands arrested. Over 100 cars are burned and numerous tourist sites are closed.	
Sudanese revolution	19 December 2018 – 12 September 2019	Sudan	Amid mass protests, Omar al-Bashir is deposed as President of Sudan in a coup d'état, after nearly 30 years in office.	
2019–2020 Hong Kong protests	9 June 2019 – 2020	Hong Kong	Mass protests take place in Hong Kong against an extradition bill that many observed would subject Hong Kong residents and those passing through the city to de facto jurisdiction of Chinese courts. Despite Hong Kong Chief Executive Carrie Lam announcing the bill to be "dead" after weeks of mass protests, waves of localised demonstrations continued, some resulting in violent clashes between police, pro-democracy activists, local residents, and Triad members.	
2019 Ecuadorian protests	3 – 14 October 2019	Ecuador	On 3 October 2019, taxi, bus and truck drivers came out in protest against the planned fuel subsidy abolition and austerity measures announced by President Lenín Moreno. The government seat was relocated from Quito to Guayaquil and a state of emergency was declared following violent protests.	
2019–2022 Chilean protests	7 October 2019 – 21 December 2021	Chile	On 18 October 2019, a period of mass protests and violent unrest began in Chile. The protests were initially in response to a fare hike on the Santiago Metro, but the scope of the protestors' demands has since expanded.	
2019 Bolivian protests	21 October – 21 November 2019	Bolivia	Following a disputed election, protests forced Evo Morales, the president since 2006, to resign and flee to Mexico. The new president, Jeanine Áñez, continued to face opposition from pro-Morales protestors.	

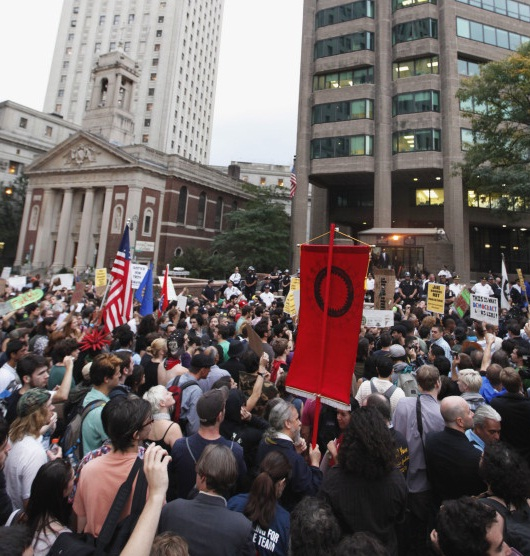
Concerns over economic inequality, greed and the influence of corporations on government led to the rise of the Occupy Wall Street movement in 2011

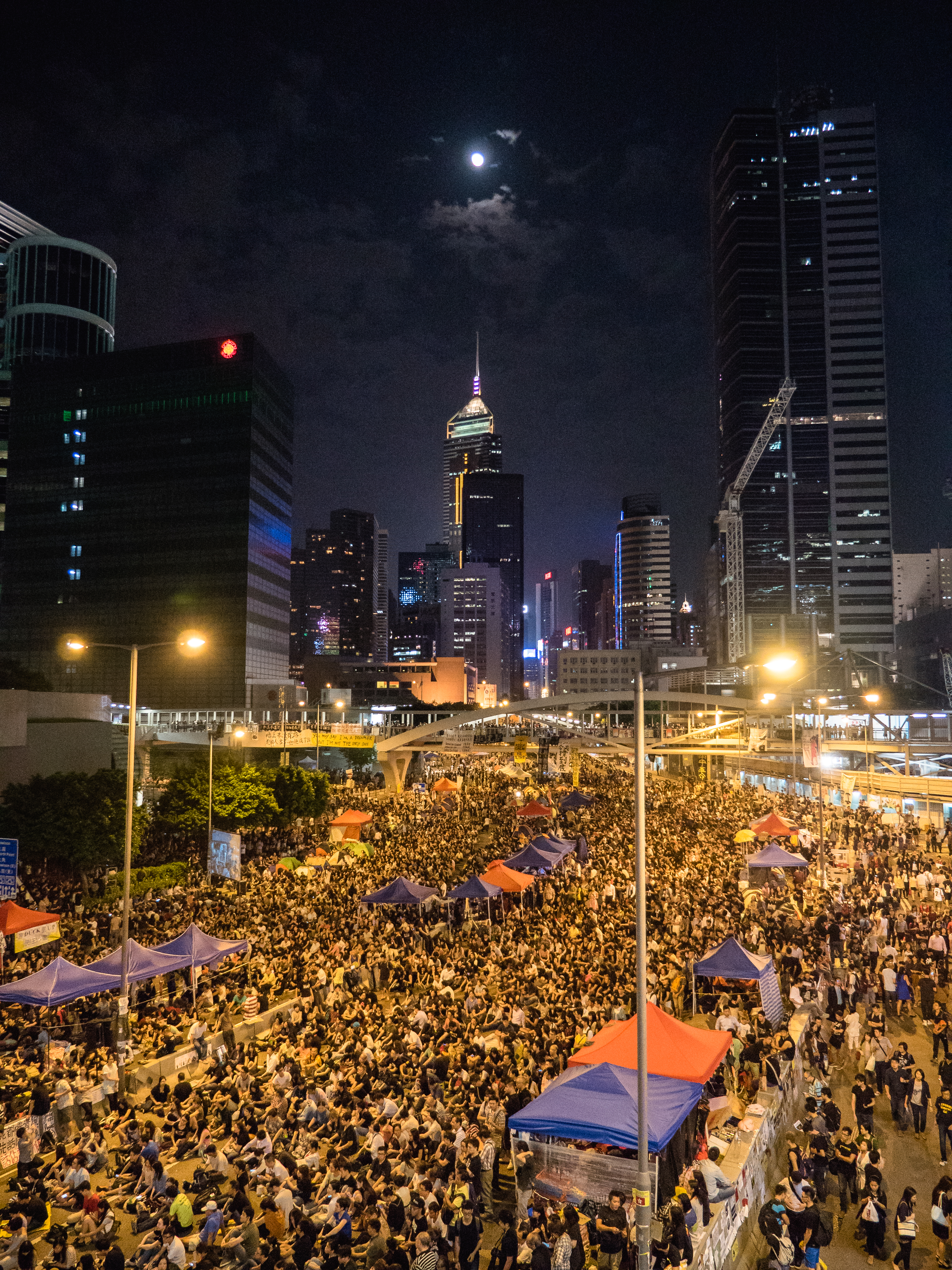
The 2014 Hong Kong protests

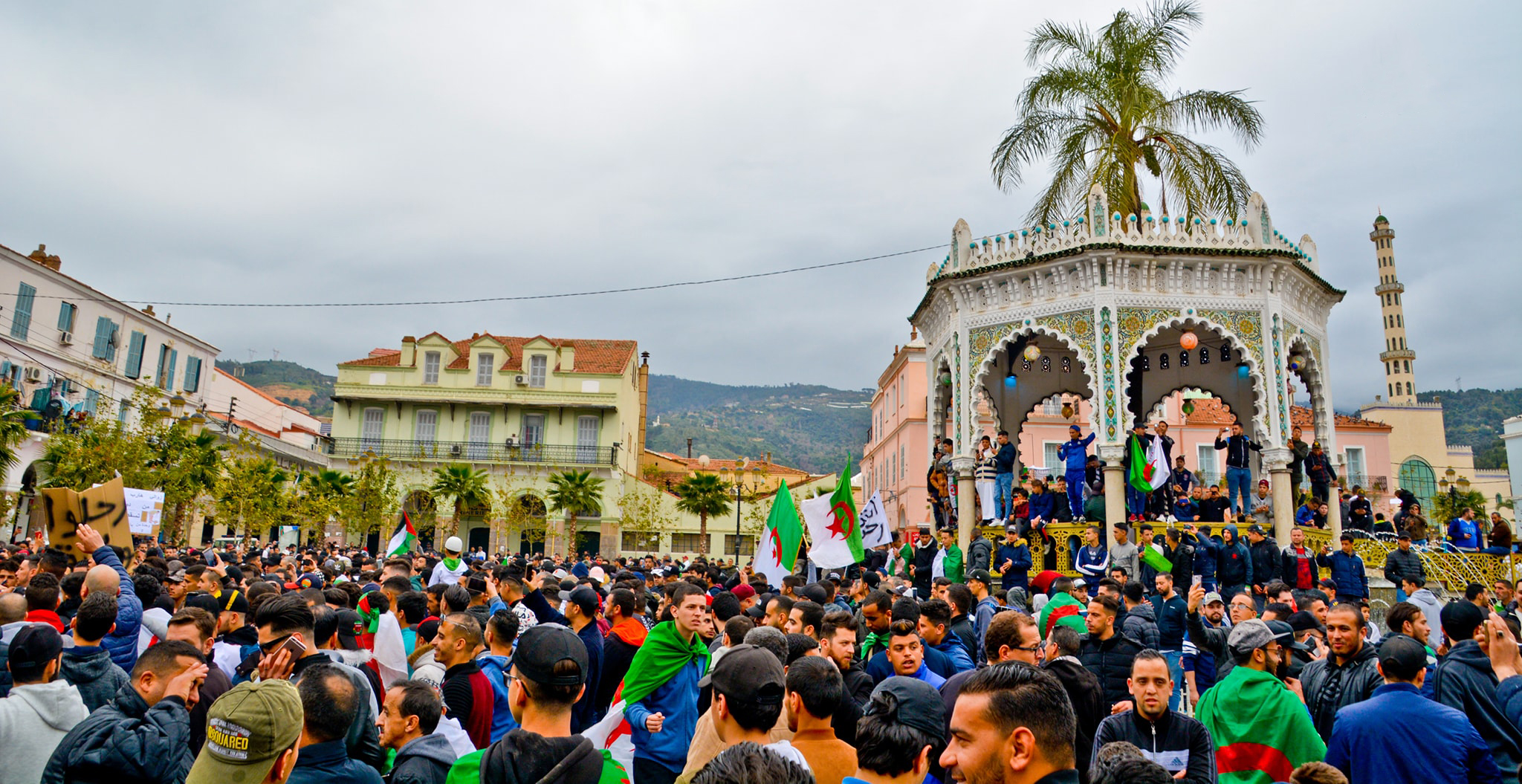
Algerian protesters gather during the 2019 "Smile Revolution"

==== Arab Spring ====
The Arab Spring was a series of anti-government protests, uprisings, and armed rebellions that spread across much of the Islamic world in the early 2010s. It began in response to oppressive regimes and a low standard of living, starting with protests in Tunisia. Social media was heralded as the driving force behind the swift spread of revolution throughout the world, as new protests appeared in response to success stories shared from those taking place in other countries. Many governments began recognising the importance of social media for citizens to organise and began shutting down certain websites or blocking Internet service entirely, especially prior to major rallies. Governments also scrutinised or suppressed discussion in online forums through accusing content creators of unrelated crimes or shutting down communication on specific sites or groups, such as through Facebook.

Event	Date	Country	Description	Ref.
Tunisian revolution	18 December 2010 – 14 January 2011	Tunisia	Amidst anti-government protests, Tunisia's president Zine El Abidine Ben Ali dissolved the government, declared a state of emergency and resigned from office.	
2011 Egyptian revolution	25 January – 11 February 2011	Egypt	On 11 February 2011, Vice President Omar Suleiman announced that Mubarak resigned as president, turning power over to the Supreme Council of the Armed Forces (SCAF).	
2011 Bahraini uprising	14 February – 18 March 2011	Bahrain	Hamad bin Isa Al Khalifa, King of Bahrain, declared a three-month state of emergency as troops from the Gulf Co-operation Council were sent to quell the civil unrest.	
Libyan civil war	15 February – 13 October 2011	Libya	Facing protests against his 42-year rule, Muammar Gaddafi refused to step down and sent in the military to brutally quell protests. As a result, many army units defected to the opposition and protests soon turned into an armed rebellion. With international help, the rebels captured Tripoli, and eventually Sirte, Gaddafi's hometown and last outpost, where he was killed.	
Syrian civil war	15 March 2011 – 8 December 2024	Ba'athist Syria	Protests erupted in Syria against President Bashar al-Assad's rule, with police and the army sent in to crack down on protesters. They later morphed into war after army officers defected to the opposition, forming the Free Syrian Army (FSA). It led to the Kurdish parties called the SDF to secede from Northeastern Syria, forming Rojava. The war also allowed for Islamic extremist groups like Al-Nusra Front and ISIL to temporarily take control of vast amounts of territory.	

The Arab Spring saw mass unrest in the Arab world early in the decade: Government overthrown multiple times Government overthrown Civil war Protests and governmental changes Major protests Minor protests Other protests and militant action outside the Arab world

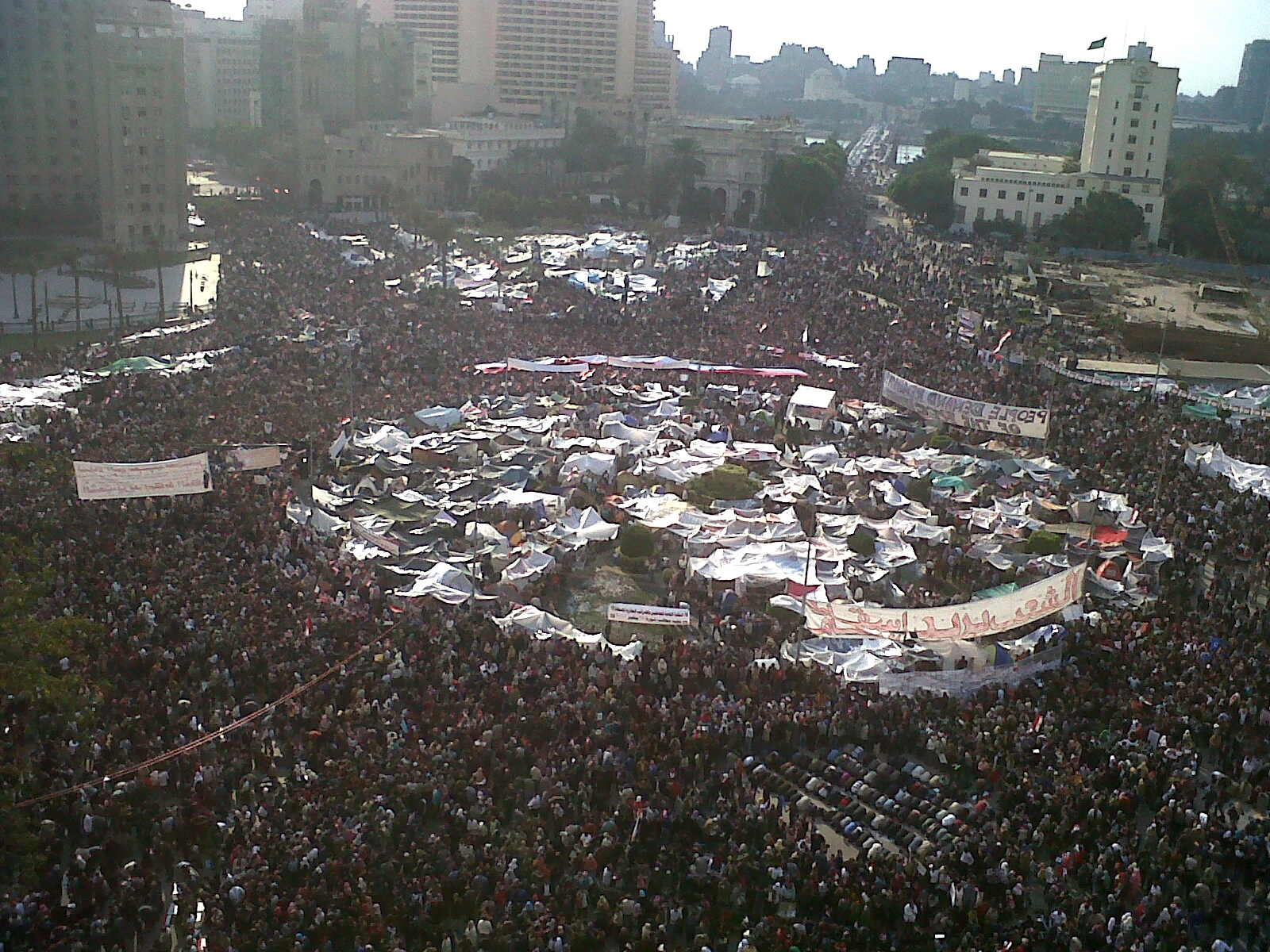
Protesters in Tahrir Square during the Egyptian revolution of 2011.

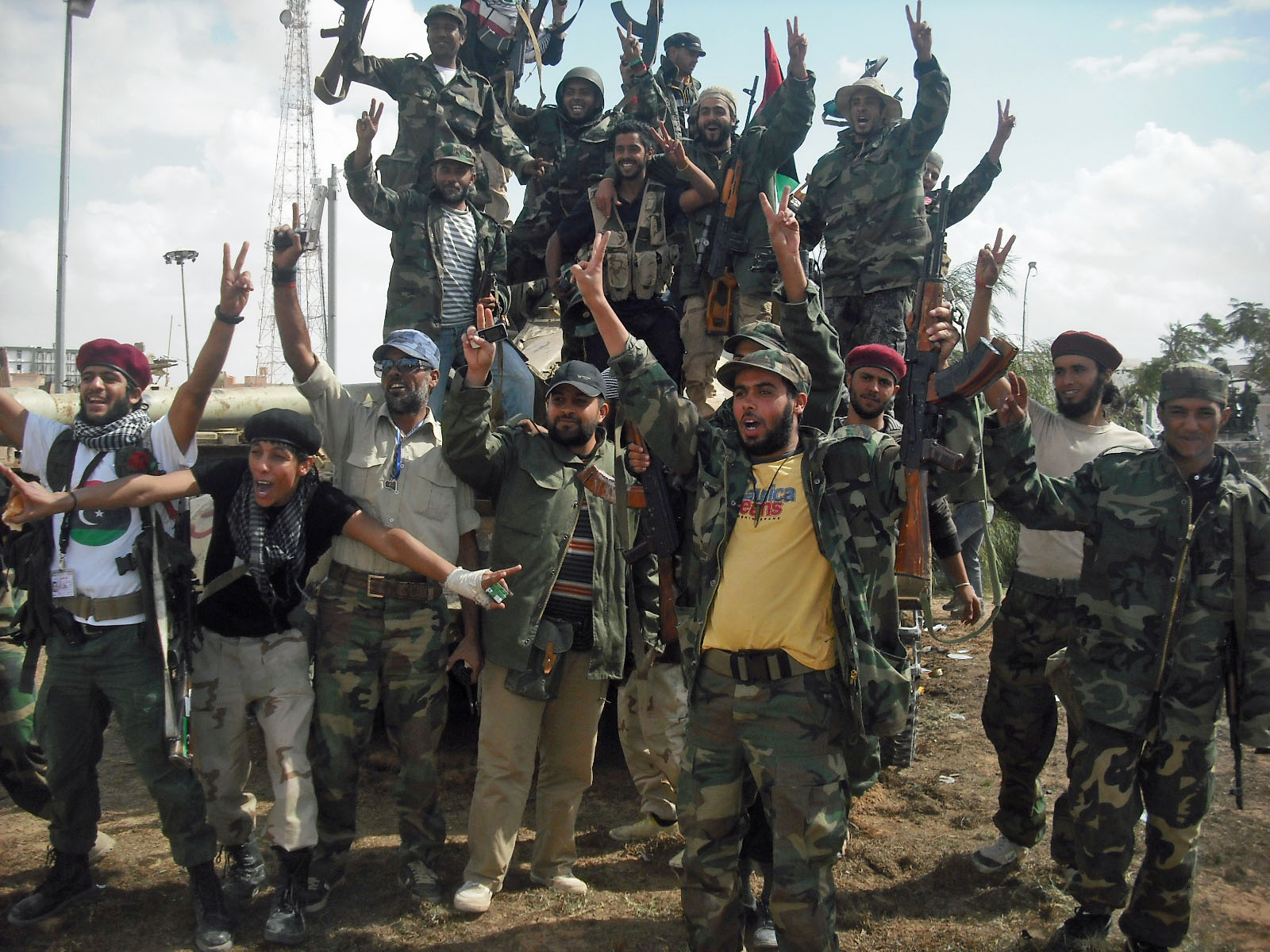
Anti-Ghaddafi fighters celebrate during the Libyan Civil War.

=== Nuclear proliferation ===
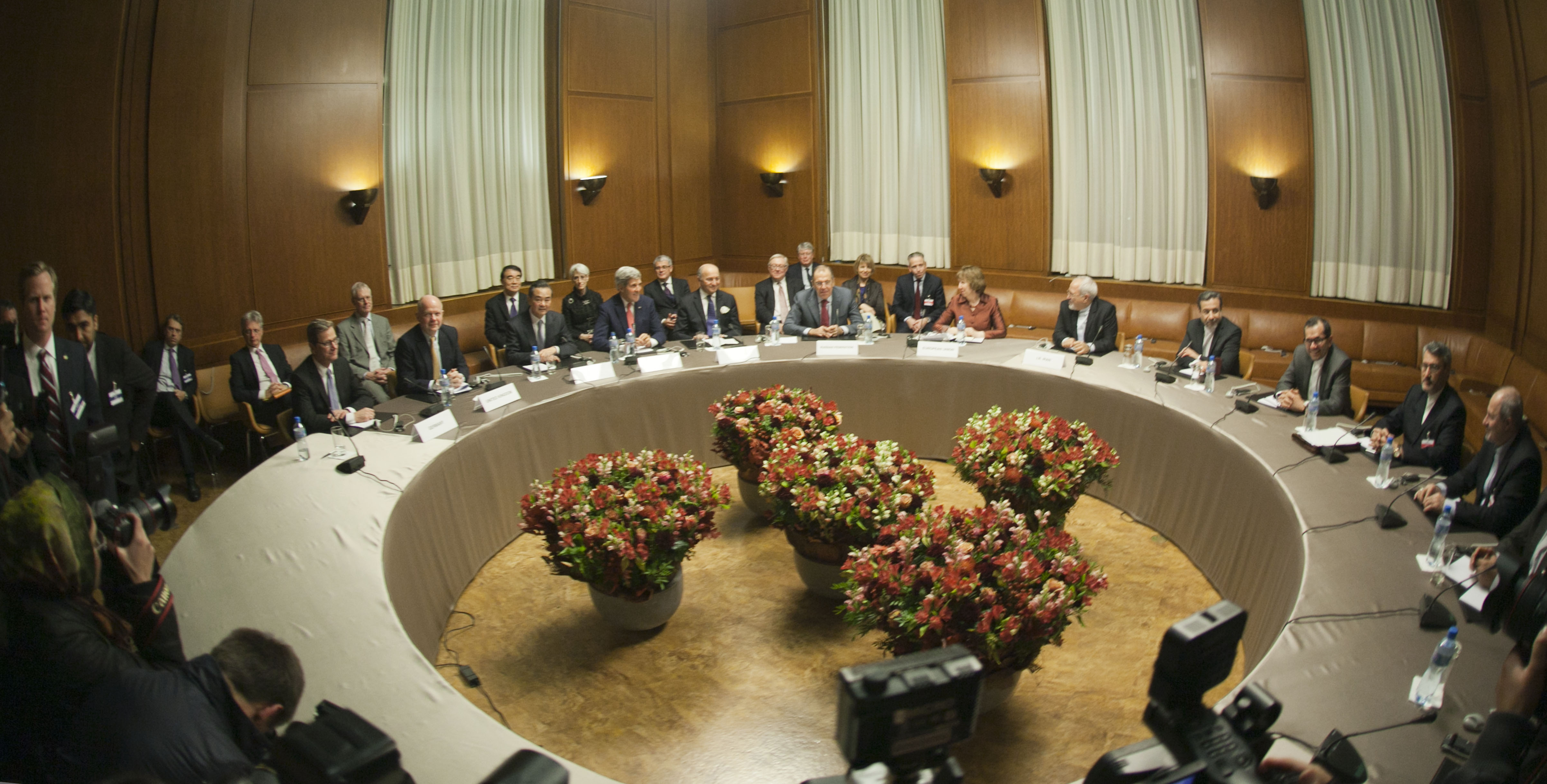
P5+1 and Iranian negotiators meeting in Geneva for the interim agreement on the Iranian nuclear programme (2013)

- On 8 April 2010, the United States and Russia signed a treaty in Prague, Czech Republic agreed to reduce the stockpiles of their nuclear weapons by half. It is meant to replace the Strategic Offensive Reductions Treaty (SORT), which was set to expire. The treaty went into force on 5 February 2011 after it was ratified by both nations.
- In 2015, Iran and other world powers agreed to trade sanctions relief for explicit constraints on Iran's contentious nuclear program, including allowing the inspections of nuclear facilities by the International Atomic Energy Agency (IAEA). On 16 January 2016 the IAEA confirmed that Iran had complied with the agreement (the JCPOA), allowing the United Nations to lift sanctions immediately. However, on 8 May 2018, United States President Donald Trump announced the United States was withdrawing from the deal.
- On 7 July 2017, the United Nations passed the Treaty on the Prohibition of Nuclear Weapons, the first legally binding international agreement to comprehensively prohibit nuclear weapons, with the goal of leading towards their total elimination. It has been signed by 58 nations.
- Throughout the decade, North Korea expanded its nuclear capabilities, performing alleged nuclear tests in 2013 and 2016, which governments responded by placing international sanctions on the country. In response North Korea has threatened the United States, South Korea and Japan with pre-emptive nuclear strikes. However, in 2018, North Korea suggested that they may disarm their nuclear arsenal after negotiations with the United States.
- On 1 February 2019, The US formally suspended the Russo-American Intermediate-Range Nuclear Forces Treaty (INF), and Russia did the same on the following day in response. The US formally withdrew from the treaty on 2 August 2019.
- The United States initiated a renovation of its nuclear weapon arsenal.

=== Terrorist attacks ===
The most prominent terrorist attacks committed against civilian populations during the decade include, but are not limited to:

Event	Date	Country	Deaths	Injuries	Ref.
2010 Lakki Marwat suicide bombing	1 January 2010	Pakistan	105	100+	
2010 Moscow Metro bombings	29 March 2010	Russia	40	102	
2011 Mumbai bombings	13 July 2011	India	26	130+	
2011 Norway attacks	22 July 2011	Norway	77	319+	
2011 Mogadishu bombing	4 October 2011	Somalia	100	110+	
Boston Marathon bombing	15 April 2013	United States	3	264	
Zamboanga City siege	9 September 2013	Philippines	220	70	
Westgate shopping mall attack	21 September 2013	Kenya	67	175	
2014 Kunming attack	1 March 2014	China	35	143	
April 2014 Ürümqi attack	30 April 2014	China	1	79	
May 2014 Ürümqi attack	22 May 2014	China	43	90	
Camp Speicher massacre	12 June 2014	Iraq	1,566	–	
Lindt Cafe siege	15 December 2014	Australia	3	18	
2014 Peshawar school massacre	16 December 2014	Pakistan	148	114	
2015 Baga massacre	3–7 January 2015	Nigeria	150+	–	
January 2015 Île-de-France attacks	7–9 January 2015	France	20	22	
2015 Sana'a mosque bombings	20 March 2015	Yemen	142	351	
Garissa University College attack	2 April 2015	Kenya	152	79	
2015 Ramadan attacks	26 June 2015	Various	403	336+	
2015 Ankara bombings	10 October 2015	Turkey	109	400+	
2015 Metrojet crash	31 October 2015	Russia	224	–	
2015 Beirut bombings	12 November 2015	Lebanon	43	240	
November 2015 Paris attacks	13 November 2015	France	131	413	
2015 San Bernardino attack	2 December 2015	United States	14	22	
2016 Brussels bombings	22 March 2016	Belgium	35	300+	
Orlando nightclub shooting	12 June 2016	United States	49	58	
2016 Atatürk Airport attack	28 June 2016	Turkey	45	236	
July 2016 Baghdad bombings	3 July 2016	Iraq	340	246	
2016 Nice truck attack	14 July 2016	France	87	434	
2016 Berlin truck attack	19 December 2016	Germany	13	55	
Istanbul nightclub shooting	1 January 2017	Turkey	39	70	
2017 Westminster attack	22 March 2017	United Kingdom	6	49	
2017 St. Petersburg Metro bombing	3 April 2017	Russia	15	64	
2017 Stockholm truck attack	7 April 2017	Sweden	5	14	
2017 Camp Shaheen attack	21 April 2017	Afghanistan	140+	160+	
Manchester Arena bombing	22 May 2017	United Kingdom	22	59	
2017 London Bridge attack	3 June 2017	UK	11	48	
2017 Barcelona attacks	17–18 August 2017	Spain	16	152	
2017 Turku attack	18 August 2017	Finland	2	8 (+1 attacker)	
14 October 2017 Mogadishu bombings	14 October 2017	Somalia	587	316	
2017 New York City truck attack	31 October 2017	United States	8	12	
2017 Sinai mosque attack	24 November 2017	Egypt	311	122	
2018 Strasbourg attack	11 December 2018	France	5	11	
Christchurch mosque shootings	15 March 2019	New Zealand	51	40	
2019 Pulwama attack	14 February 2019	India	40	35	
2019 Sri Lanka Easter bombings	21 April 2019	Sri Lanka	269	500+	
2019 El Paso shooting	3 August 2019	United States	23	23	
December 2019 Mogadishu bombing	28 December 2019	Somalia	85	140+	

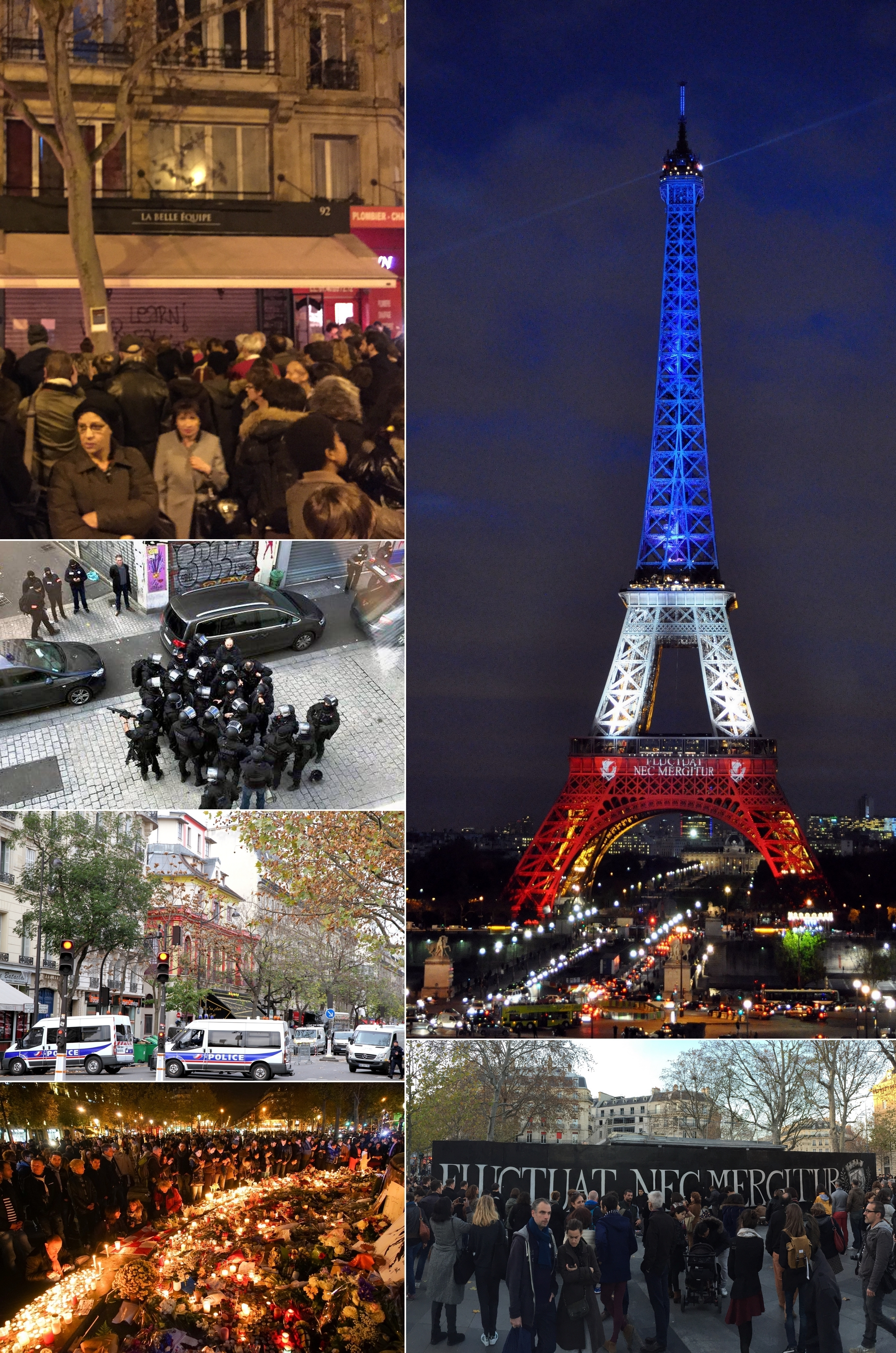
Montage of the November 2015 Paris attacks. Islamic terrorism in Europe spiked following the rise of the Islamic State in 2014.

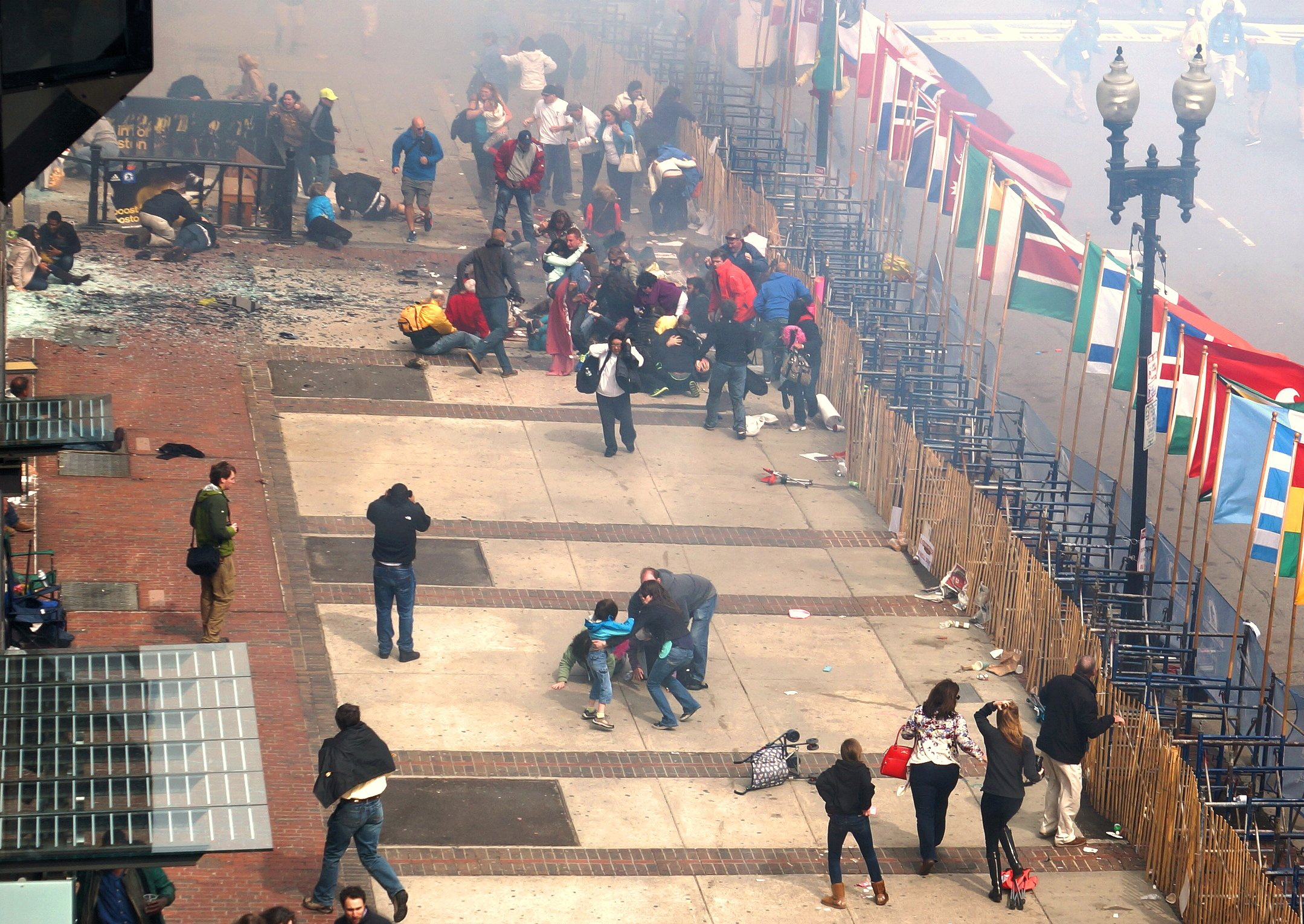
Two bombs explode near the finish line at the Boston Marathon on 15 April 2013.

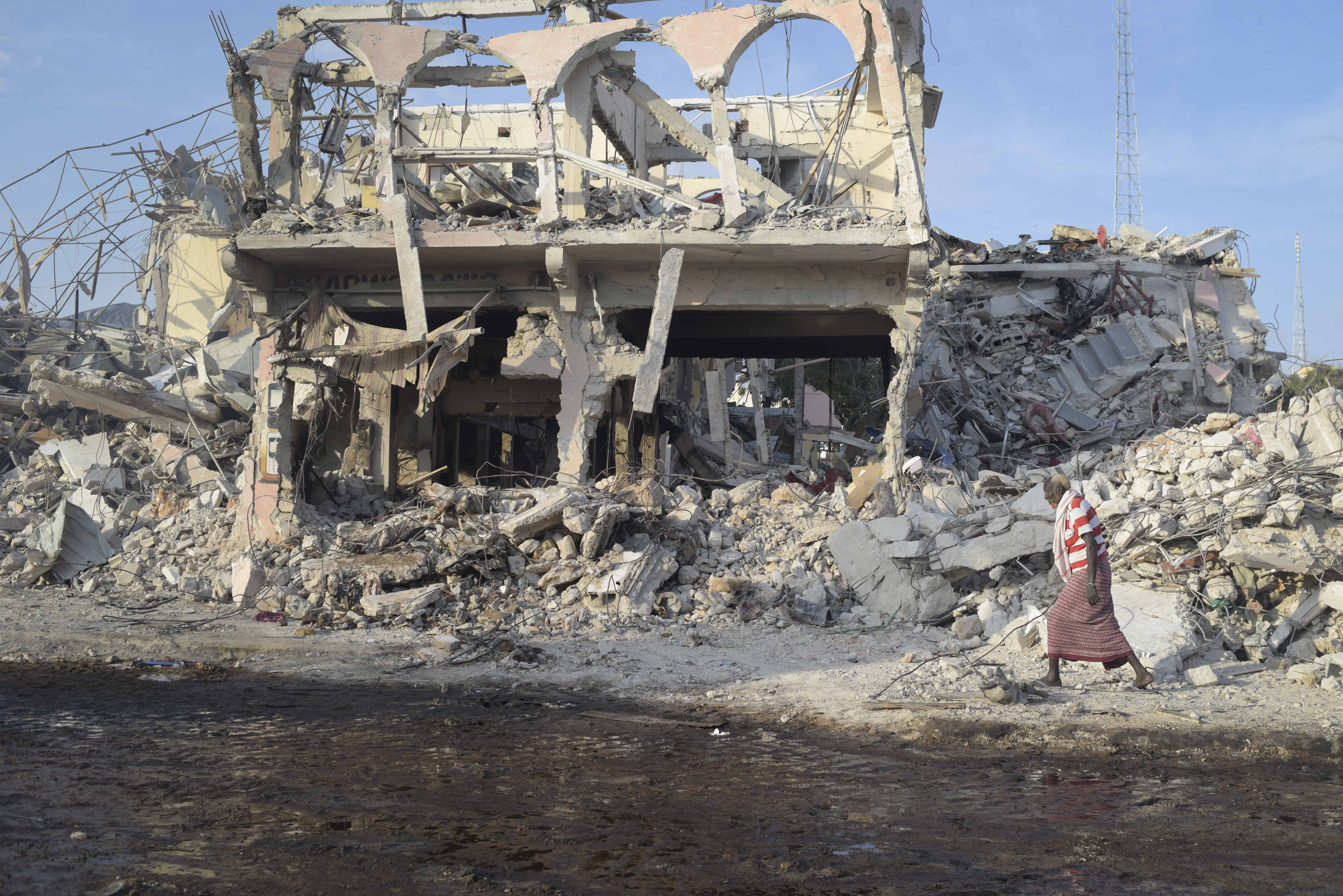
The ruins of buildings destroyed in the 14 October 2017 Mogadishu bombings, which killed over 500 people.

=== Political trends ===
==== International relations ====
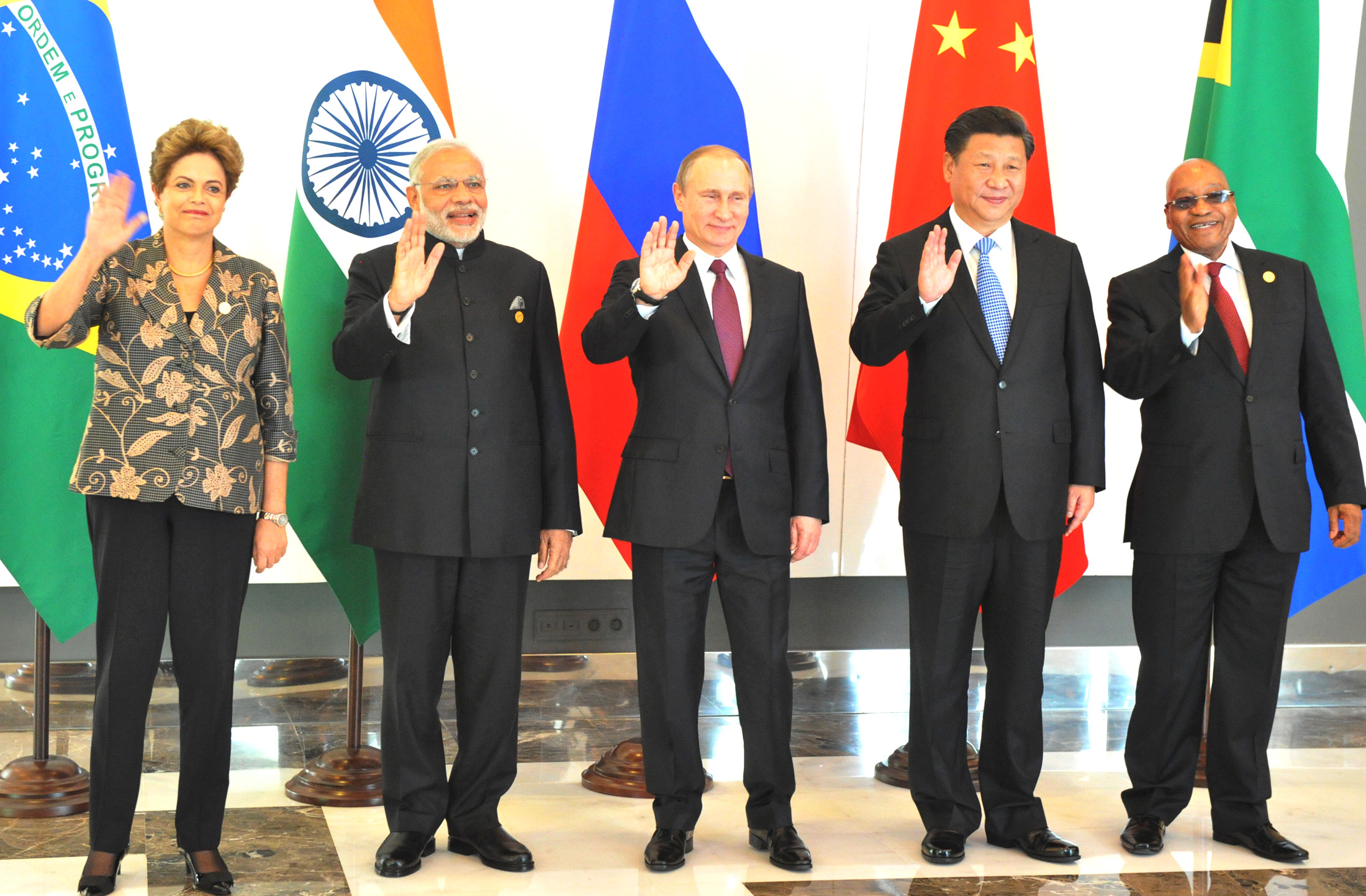
BRICS, a supranational economic cooperative comprising five major emerging national economies—Brazil, Russia, India, China and South Africa—grew to represent over 3.1 billion people, or about 41 percent of the world population by 2015.

China was increasingly called a superpower in the early 2010s, including at the 2011 meeting between President Hu Jintao and United States President Barack Obama. By the end of the decade, China overtook the U.S. as the world's largest trading nation and the country filing the most patents, dramatically expanded its military and landed its lunar rover Yutu on the moon, ending a four-decade hiatus of lunar exploration. In 2018, global military spending reached its highest level since 1988, late Cold War levels, largely fuelled by increased defence spending by the United States (4.6% increase to $649 billion) and China (5% increase to $250 billion). Together, their budgets accounted for half of the world's total military spending. In 2019, the Lowy Institute Asia Power Index, which measures the projections of power across eight indexes in the Indo-Pacific, ranked the United States at #1 with a score of 84.5 and China #2 with a score of 75.9.

Along with the United States and China, Russia under President Vladimir Putin steadily increased its defence spending and continued to modernise its military throughout the decade. This included the development of the T-14 Armata main battle tank and the fifth-generation Sukhoi Su-57 jet fighter. Russia also exercised its power projection capabilities in its 2014 annexation of Crimea and interventions in eastern Ukraine and the Syrian Civil War. Russia also waged information warfare campaigns against its geopolitical foes, interfering in the 2016 U.S. elections via hacking and leaking emails of U.S. political party leadership and by spreading disinformation via the Internet Research Agency. Other alleged Russian intelligence operations included the 2016 Montenegrin coup plot and the 2018 Skripal poisonings, both of which were attributed by some to the GRU's Unit 29155. Collectively, these activities—and the Western-led efforts to combat them—have been referred to as marking the beginning of the Second Cold War.

The European Union went through several crises. The European debt crisis caused severe economic problems to several eurozone member states, most notably Greece. The 2015 migration crisis led to several million people entering the EU illegally in a short period of time. There was a significant rise in the vote shares of several eurosceptic parties, including the League in Italy, Alternative for Germany, and the Finns Party in Finland. As a result of a referendum, the United Kingdom became the first member state in the EU's history to leave the Union.

==== Western polarisation ====
Socio-political polarisation increased as conservatives and social liberals clashed over the role and size of government and other social, economic and environmental issues in the West. In the United States, polls showed a divided electorate regarding healthcare reform, immigration, gun rights, taxation, job creation, and debt reduction. In Europe, movements protesting increasing numbers of refugees and migrants from Islamic countries developed, such as the English Defence League and Pegida. The trend of polarisation in the West was partially influenced by the prevalence of identity politics, both left-wing and right-wing, among activist movements. Beginning around 2011, far-left and progressive concepts such as combating social inequality and economic inequality, often via progressive stack tactics, proliferated in the Western world and elsewhere. Around the middle of the decade, phenomenon such as white nationalism, identitarianism and emboldened feelings of nativism saw a marked reemergence in the West due to drastically increased migration and corresponding crime and amongst both the right and left general dissatisfaction with Western government and Media responses to certain issues. There were also increased calls for egalitarianism, including between the sexes, and some scholars assert that a fourth wave of feminism began around 2012, with a primary focus on intersectionality.

==== Anti-establishment politics ====
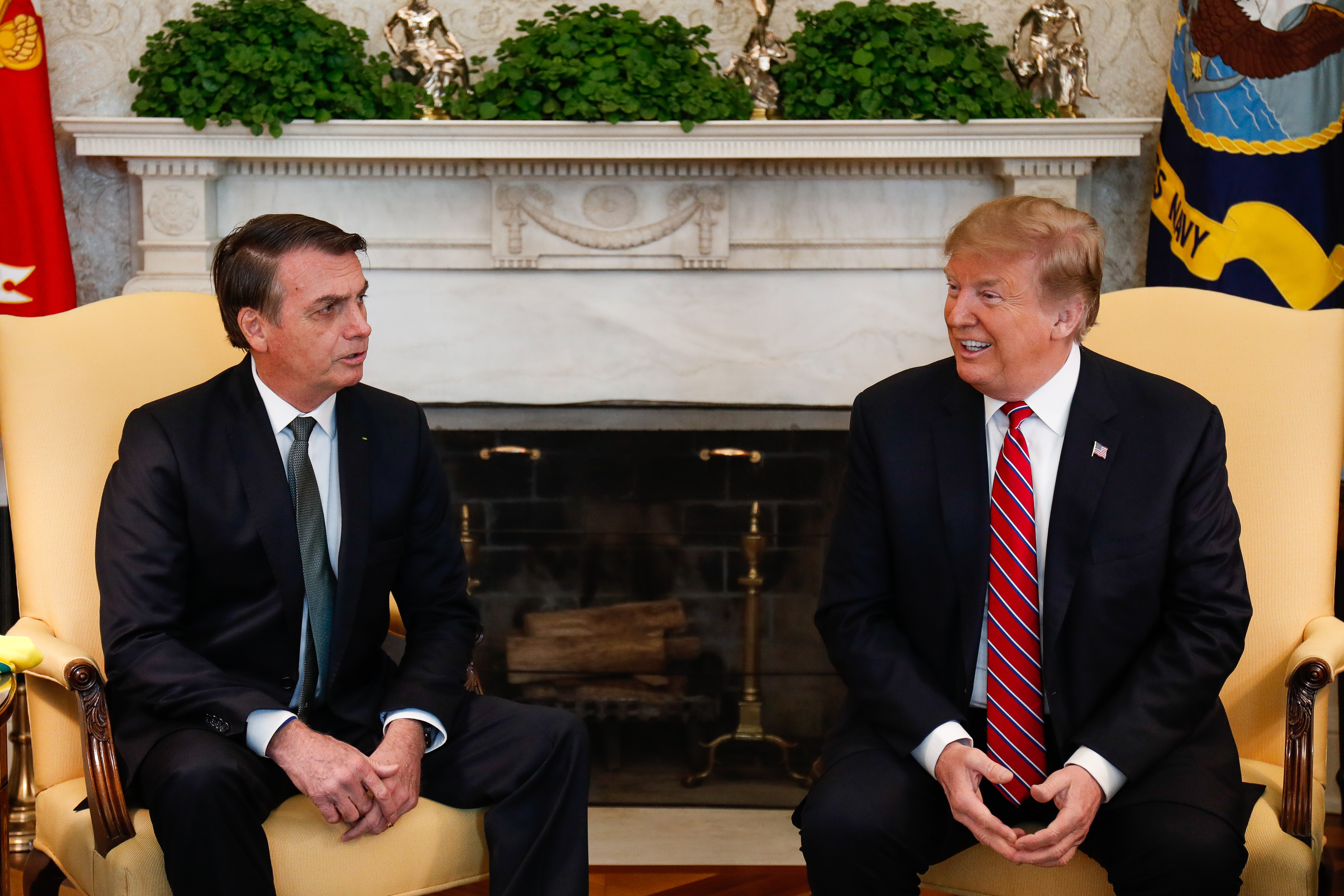
Brazilian President Jair Bolsonaro and United States President Donald Trump in 2019. Both are emblematic of a wave of neo-nationalist and globalisation-weary conservative populism in the second half of the decade.

Populism in politics saw a widespread surge throughout the decade, with many politicians and various political movements expressing populist sentiments and utilising populist rhetoric. This included conservative wave phenomenon in Latin America and neo-nationalist fervor in Europe and North America. The 2019 European Parliament election saw the highest voter turnout in two decades and saw relatively moderate centre-right and centre-left parties suffer significant losses to less moderate far-right, environmentalist, and both pro-EU and eurosceptic parties, who made gains. Examples of 2010s populist movements included the Tea Party movement, Occupy Wall Street, Brexit, Black Lives Matter, and the alt-right. Examples of populist country leaders were just as extensive, with Donald Trump, Narendra Modi, Andrés Manuel López Obrador, Hugo Chávez, Matteo Salvini, Jair Bolsonaro, Rodrigo Duterte, Boris Johnson, Viktor Orbán, Robert Fico, Antonis Samaras and Alexis Tsipras left and right-wing, described as such.

Related to the rise of populism and protests movements was the decline of traditional political parties. In Europe, pasokification described the loss of vote share experienced by traditional centre-left or social democratic parties. In France, specifically, Emmanuel Macron's La République En Marche! party won a majority in its first election in 2017.

Centre-left, neoliberal and traditional social democratic parties often lost their vote share to more socialist or democratic socialist alternatives, especially in Europe. This happened most completely in Greece, where PASOK was replaced by Syriza as the main left-wing party. Other far-left parties which rose in prominence included Podemos in Spain and La France Insoumise in France. In the two-party systems of the English-speaking world, these challenges mainly came from within the established parties of the left, with Bernie Sanders in the Democratic Party and Jeremy Corbyn in the Labour Party pushing for more left-wing policies.

The political establishment was also challenged in many countries by protest movements, often organised through new social media platforms. These included the various Arab Spring protests, the Occupy movement, and the yellow vests movement.

==== Democratisation and authoritarianism ====
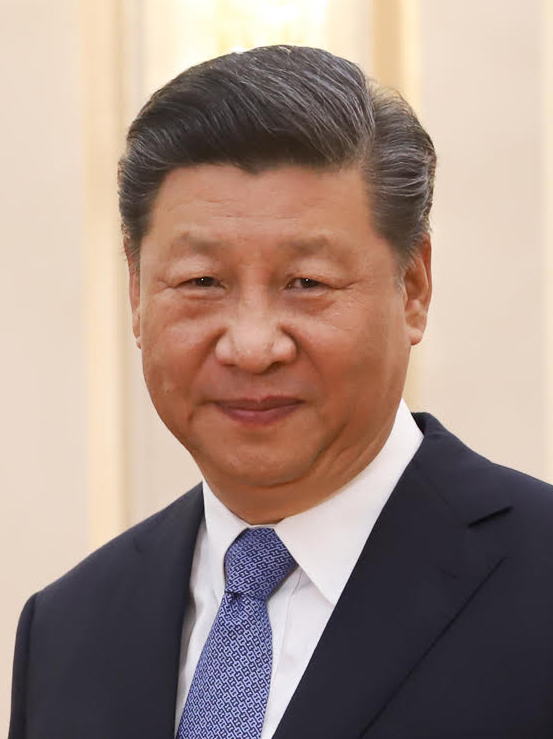
Xi Jinping became China's leader for life in 2018.

Countries which democratised fully or partially during the decade included Angola, which reformed under João Lourenço; Armenia, which went through a revolution; Ecuador, which reformed under Lenín Moreno; Ethiopia; and Malaysia, where the ruling party lost the first election since independence.

Long-term dictators ousted from power included Muammar Gaddafi of Libya (after 42 years), Robert Mugabe of Zimbabwe (37 years), Ali Abdullah Saleh of Yemen (33 years), Omar al-Bashir of Sudan (30 years), Hosni Mubarak of Egypt (29 years), and Ben Ali of Tunisia (23 years).

The Arab Winter refers to the resurgence of authoritarianism, absolute monarchies and Islamic extremism evolving in the aftermath of the Arab Spring protests in Arab countries. The term "Arab Winter" refers to the events across Arab League countries in the Mid-East and North Africa, including the Syrian Civil War, the Iraqi insurgency and the following civil war, the Egyptian Crisis, the Libyan crisis and the crisis in Yemen. Events referred to as the Arab Winter include those in Egypt that led to the removal of Mohamed Morsi and the seizure of power by General Abdel Fattah el-Sisi in an anti-Muslim Brotherhood campaign.

Democratic backsliding also occurred in countries such as Hungary, Venezuela, and Turkey.

In 2018, China's National People's Congress approved a constitutional change that removed term limits for its leaders, granting Xi Jinping the status of "leader for life". Xi is the General Secretary of the Chinese Communist Party (de facto leader).

==== Deaths ====
Sitting world leaders such as Hugo Chávez of Venezuela, Muammar Gaddafi of Libya, Kim Jong-il of North Korea, Abdullah of Saudi Arabia, Lech Kaczyński of Poland, Zillur Rahman of Bangladesh, Islam Karimov of Uzbekistan and Beji Caid Essebsi of Tunisia, all died in office.

=== Prominent political events ===
==== Coups ====
Coups d'état against ruling governments during the decade include:

Event	Date	Country	Ref.
Nigerien coup d'état	18 February 2010	Niger	
Malian coup d'état	21 March 2012	Mali	
Guinea-Bissau coup d'état	12 April 2012	Guinea-Bissau	
Egyptian coup d'état	3 July 2013	Egypt	
Thai coup d'état	22 May 2014	Thailand	
Yemeni coup d'état	21 September 2014	Yemen	
Turkish coup d'état attempt	15 July 2016	Turkey	
Zimbabwean coup d'état	14 November 2017	Zimbabwe	
Gabon coup d'état attempt	7 January 2019	Gabon	
Sudanese coup d'état	11 April 2019	Sudan	
Amhara coup d'état attempt	22 June 2019	Ethiopia	

The following tables of events is listed by the region and by chronological order. The prominent political events include, but are not limited to:

==== Africa ====
Event	Country	Date	Description	References
2011 South Sudanese independence referendum	South Sudan	9 July 2011	A referendum was held in Southern Sudan on whether the region should remain part of Sudan. An overwhelming majority voted in favour of separation and formed the new country of South Sudan.	
Death of Nelson Mandela	South Africa	5 December 2013	Nelson Mandela, anti-apartheid activist and President of South Africa from 1994 to 1999, died at the age of 95.	
2014 Tunisian presidential election	Tunisia	21 November 2014	Beji Caid Essebsi won the first regular presidential election following the Tunisian revolution against outgoing president Moncef Marzouki. He became Tunisia's fifth president and first freely elected head of state in the Arab world.	
2015 Nigerian general election	Nigeria	29 March 2015	Muhammadu Buhari was elected President of Nigeria, the first time the opposition ever won an election against an incumbent and the first ever peaceful transfer of power in the country.	
2016 Gambian presidential election	Gambia	1 December 2016	Adama Barrow was elected President of The Gambia, defeating long-time President Yahya Jammeh and ending more than 22 years of authoritarian rule.	
Resignation of Jacob Zuma	South Africa	14 February 2018	Jacob Zuma resigns as President of South Africa, after nine years in power.	
Resignation of Abdelaziz Bouteflika	Algeria	2 April 2019	Abdelaziz Bouteflika resigns as President of Algeria amid widespread protests, after nearly two decades in office.	
Khartoum massacre	Sudan	3 June 2019	Security forces of the Transitional Military Council, the military junta ruling Sudan following the ousting of Omar al-Bashir, massacre over 100 people at a sit-in protest amid mass protests in Khartoum. The massacre prompts the African Union to suspend Sudan's participation until civilian rule is reestablished in the country.	
2019 Tunisian presidential election	Tunisia	13 October 2019	Conservative academic Kais Saied wins more than 70% of the votes, defeating businessman Nabil Karoui. He became Tunisia's sixth president and second freely elected head of state in the Arab world.	

==== Americas ====
Event	Country	Date	Description	References
Patient Protection and Affordable Care Act	United States	23 March 2010	President Barack Obama signs the Patient Protection and Affordable Care Act into law, marking a major reform of the U.S. health insurance and health care systems.	
2010 Brazilian presidential election	Brazil	31 October 2010	Dilma Rousseff was elected as the first female President of Brazil.	
2010 Midterm elections and Tea Party movement	United States	2 November 2010	The Republicans become the dominant party with a majority of the seats in the U.S. House of Representatives and gain seats in the U.S. Senate. This was seen as due to a tide of Libertarian support amongst the U.S. populace exemplified in the Tea Party.	
2011 Canadian federal election	Canada	2 May 2011	Stephen Harper, leader of the Conservative Party, is re-elected in Canada's federal election, with a majority government.	
2011 Argentine general election	Argentina	23 October 2011	Front for Victory candidate and President Cristina Fernández de Kirchner wins a second term as President of Argentina, defeating Socialist candidate Hermes Binner by 54% of votes.	
Impeachment of Fernando Lugo	Paraguay	22 June 2012	On 21 June the Chamber of Deputies voted 76 to 1 to impeach Lugo, and the Senate removed him from office the following day, by 39 votes to 4, resulting in Vice President Federico Franco, who had broken with Lugo, becoming president.	
2012 Mexican general election	Mexico	1 July 2012	Enrique Peña Nieto won the Mexican general election, bringing the Institutional Revolutionary Party back to prominence for the first time since 2000.	
2012 United States presidential election	United States	6 November 2012	Barack Obama was re-elected President of the United States, defeating Republican nominee Mitt Romney.	
Death of Hugo Chávez	Venezuela	5 March 2013	Venezuelan President Hugo Chávez died at the age of 58 after governing the country for 14 years.	
Obergefell v. Hodges	United States	26 June 2015	Same-sex marriage was legalised in all 50 U.S. states due to a landmark decision by the Supreme Court of the United States.	
2015 Canadian federal election	Canada	19 October 2015	The Liberal Party, led by Justin Trudeau, won Canada's federal election, defeating the Conservative Party in the country's longest election in a century.	
2015 Venezuelan parliamentary election	Venezuela	6 December 2015	The Democratic Unity Roundtable (MUD) won majority seats of the Venezuelan National Assembly, defeating the ruling United Socialist Party of Venezuela (PSUV) and its wider alliance, the Great Patriotic Pole (GPP) for the first time since 1999.	
Impeachment of Dilma Rousseff	Brazil	12 May 2016	The Brazilian Senate votes to open the impeachment process against President Dilma Rousseff and suspend her from office while the trial takes place, as the Vice President, Michel Temer, assumes the presidential powers and duties as Acting President of Brazil.	
2016 United States presidential election	United States	8 November 2016	Republican nominee Donald Trump was elected the 45th President of the United States, defeating former U.S. Secretary of State and Democratic nominee Hillary Clinton. He became the first President without prior diplomatic or military experience.	
Death of Fidel Castro	Cuba	25 November 2016	Former First Secretary of the Communist Party of Cuba and revolutionary leader Fidel Castro died at the age of 90.	
2017 Venezuelan constitutional crisis	Venezuela	29 March 2017	The Supreme Tribunal of Justice of Venezuela took over legislative powers of the National Assembly and removed its members' immunity, most of whom belonged to the opposition. The decision was reversed a few days later following domestic and international condemnation of the court's actions.	
2017–present Peruvian political crisis	Peru	15 September 2017–present	Peruvian president Pedro Pablo Kuczynski was impeached and later resigned. His successor Martín Vizcarra was removed by congress and appointed Vice President Mercedes Aráoz as interim president, moves that were largely seen as illegitimate.	
Inauguration of Miguel Díaz-Canel	Cuba	19 April 2018	Miguel Díaz-Canel is sworn in as President of the State Council of Cuba, marking the first time since 1959 that Cuba has had a prime minister or a president other than Fidel or Raúl Castro.	
2018 Mexican general election	Mexico	1 July 2018	Andrés Manuel López Obrador won the historic Mexican general election, bringing the National Regeneration Movement for new prominence for the first time without any political rule like Institutional Revolutionary Party and National Action Party.	
2018 Brazilian general election	Brazil	28 October 2018	Jair Bolsonaro was elected President of Brazil, marking the first time that the country is ruled by the right since the start of the New Republic in 1985. The election also interrupted 4 victories of the Workers' Party in a row.	
Death of George H. W. Bush	United States	30 November 2018	George H. W. Bush, former president of United States from 1989 to 1993 and former vice president, from 1981 to 1989, dies at the age of 94.	
Venezuelan presidential crisis	Venezuela	10 January 2019	On 10 January 2019, the opposition-majority National Assembly declared that incumbent Nicolás Maduro's 2018 reelection was invalid and declared its president, Juan Guaidó, to be acting president of the nation. Maduro's government states that the crisis is a "coup d'état led by the United States to topple him and control the country's oil reserves."	
2019 Argentine general election	Argentina	27 October 2019	Peronist candidate Alberto Fernández of Frente de Todos is elected President of Argentina, defeating President Mauricio Macri of Juntos por el Cambio by 48% of votes.	
2019 Bolivian political crisis	Bolivia	10 November 2019	Bolivian president Evo Morales resigns following 19 days of protests after the disputed 2019 Bolivian general election and following calls for his resignation by the military.	
First Impeachment of Donald Trump	United States	18 December 2019	United States president Donald Trump is impeached by the House of Representatives on charges of abuse of power and obstruction of Congress.	

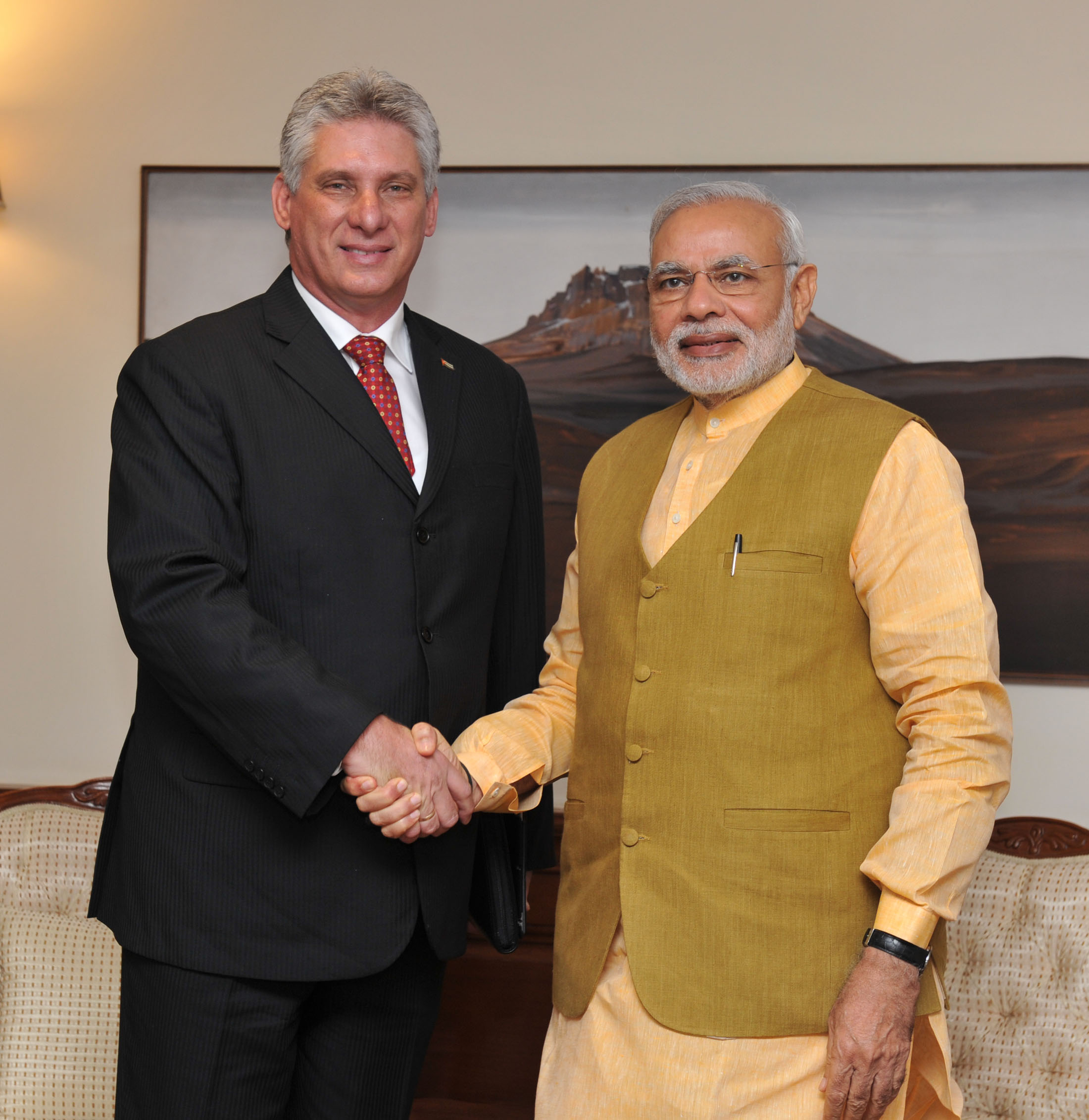
Miguel Díaz-Canel (left) with Indian Prime Minister Narendra Modi in March 2015. Díaz-Canel became the first president of Cuba not to be of the Castro family since Osvaldo Dorticós

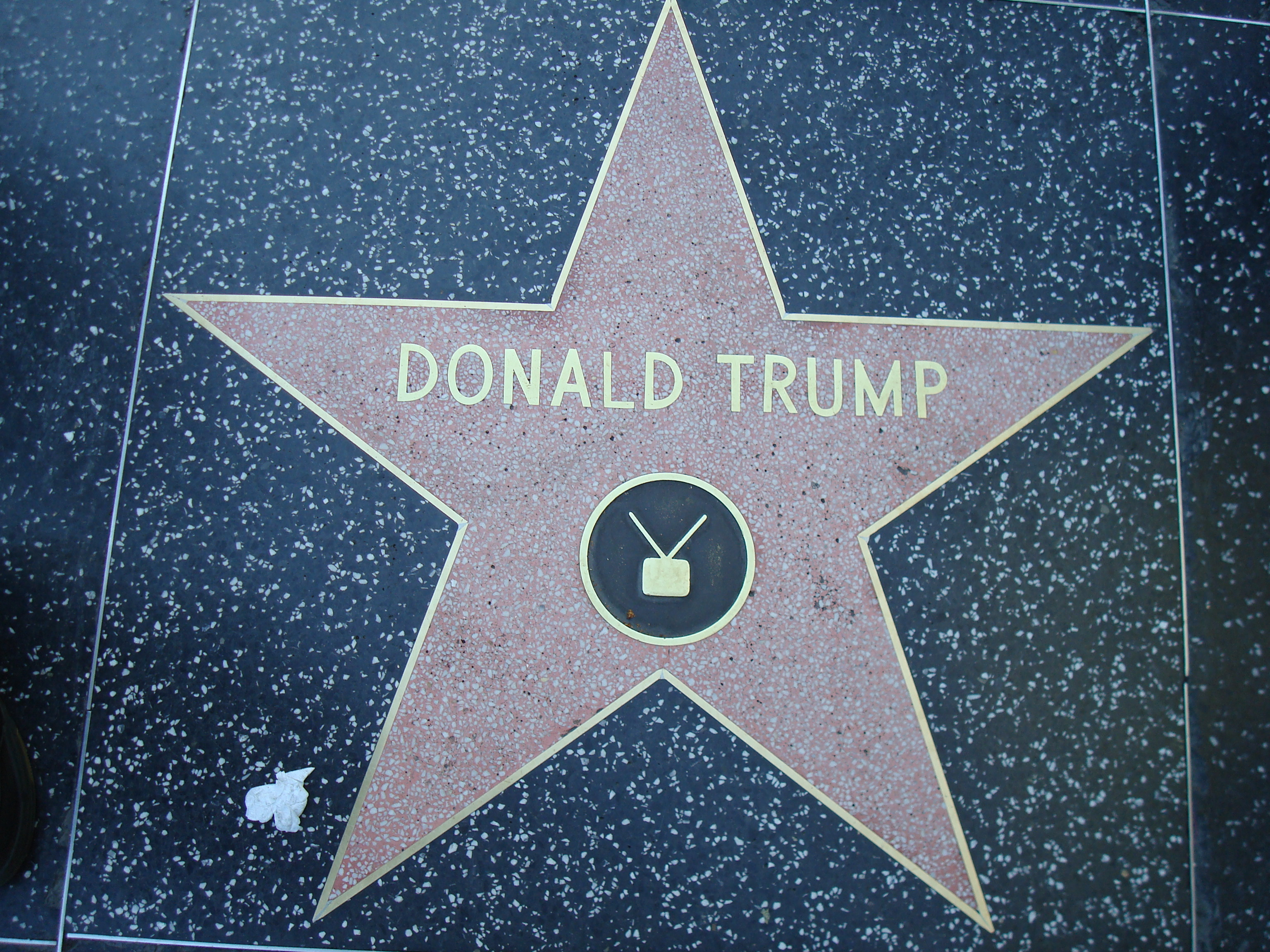
Donald Trump, a celebrity (filmography) and businessman, became president of the United States in 2017. Trump was the first U.S. president without prior military or government experience. Had Hillary Clinton been elected in 2016, she would have been the United States' first female president. Hillary Clinton won the popular vote in 2016, but did not win the electoral college.

==== Asia ====
Event	Country	Date	Description	References
2010 Myanmar general election	Myanmar	7 November 2010	Thein Sein was elected President of Myanmar, the first civilian President of the country since 1962.	
Death of Kim Jong-il	North Korea	17 December 2011	Supreme Leader Kim Jong-il of North Korea died after governing the country for 17 years. His son, Kim Jong-un, succeeded him.	
2012 Japanese general election	Japan	26 December 2012	The Liberal Democratic Party, led by Shinzō Abe, won a landslide victory in Japan's general election.	
North Korea and weapons of mass destruction	North Korea	11 March 2013	The Supreme Leader Kim Jong-un of North Korea broke all peace pacts with South Korea and started a new nuclear weapons plan, inflaming tensions on the Korean Peninsula.	
2014 Indian general election	India	12 May 2014	The Bharatiya Janata Party, led by Narendra Modi, won a landslide victory in India's general election, the first time a single party gained a majority on its own since 1984.	
2014 Indonesian presidential election	Indonesia	9 July 2014	Joko Widodo won Indonesia's presidential election, becoming the first president not to be from the country's political elite or military.	
Pastoral and state visit by Pope Francis to the Philippines	Philippines	15–19 January 2015	An estimated 6 to 7 million attended the Concluding Eucharistic Celebration in Manila on the Feast Day of Santo Niño de Cebú, ending the 5-day apostolic and state visit of Pope Francis in the Philippines, the largest papal crowd in history.	
Death of King Abdullah	Saudi Arabia	23 January 2015	Abdullah, the King of Saudi Arabia from 2005 to 2015, died and was succeeded by King Salman.	
Death of Lee Kuan Yew	Singapore	23 March 2015	Founding Prime Minister of Singapore who ruled from 1959 to 1990, highly regarded as the founding father of the nation, died from pneumonia at the age of 91.	
India–Bangladesh enclaves exchange	India Bangladesh	6 June 2015	India and Bangladesh officially ratified their 1974 agreement to exchange enclaves along their border.	
2016 Taiwanese general election	Taiwan	16 January 2016	Tsai Ing-wen was elected President of Taiwan, the first woman to hold the position.	
2016 Philippine presidential election	Philippines	9 May 2016	Rodrigo Duterte was elected President of the Philippines.	
Death of Bhumibol Adulyadej	Thailand	13 October 2016	Bhumibol Adulyadej, the King of Thailand from 1946 to 2016, died and was succeeded by his son, Vajiralongkorn.	
Impeachment of Park Geun-hye	South Korea	10 March 2017	South Korean President Park Geun-hye is impeached by the Constitutional Court of Korea in a unanimous decision, terminating Park's presidency. South Korean Prime Minister Hwang Kyo-ahn assumes power following the ruling.	
2017 South Korean presidential election	South Korea	9 May 2017	Moon Jae-in was elected the 12th President of South Korea, originally scheduled to take place later in the year, the election was moved to early May following the impeachment of President Park Geun-hye.	
2018 Malaysian general election	Malaysia	9 May 2018	The opposition-led Pakatan Harapan coalition, led by former Prime Minister Mahathir Mohamad, secures a parliamentary majority in the Malaysian Parliament, ending the 61-year rule of the Barisan Nasional coalition and leading to the pardon of Anwar Ibrahim.	
2018–2019 Korean Peace Process	South Korea North Korea United States	February 2018 – October 2019	A series of peace summits between the Supreme Leader of North Korea Kim Jong-un, the President of South Korea Moon Jae-in, and the President of the United States Donald Trump. Three inter-Korean summits occurred at the Korean Demilitarized Zone in April 2018, May 2018, and September 2018 between Kim and Moon. Additionally, two meetings between Kim and Trump occurred in Singapore in June 2018 and Hanoi in February 2019. All three leaders met and crossed the DMZ in June 2019.	
Abdication of Muhammad V of Kelantan	Malaysia	6 January 2019	Muhammad V of Kelantan abdicates the federal throne as the 15th monarch of Malaysia, making him the first Yang di-Pertuan Agong to do so.	
2019 Kim–Putin meeting	North Korea Russia	25 April 2019	North Korean supreme leader Kim Jong-un meets with Russian president Vladimir Putin on Russky Island after being invited to hold talks.	
Abdication of Akihito	Japan	30 April 2019	Akihito, the Emperor of Japan from 1989 to 2019, abdicated and was succeeded by his son, Naruhito.	
2019–20 Persian Gulf crisis	Iran United States	5 May 2019	The Persian Gulf region saw tensions between the United States and the Islamic Republic of Iran escalate in mid-2019. The crisis saw oil tankers in the Strait of Hormuz sabotaged and seized, drone shootdowns, and efforts by the U.S. and United Kingdom to pursue military patrols to protect shipping in the gulf.	

In 2013, China launched the ambitious Belt and Road infrastructure initiative, with over 150 countries announcing participation by the end of the decade.

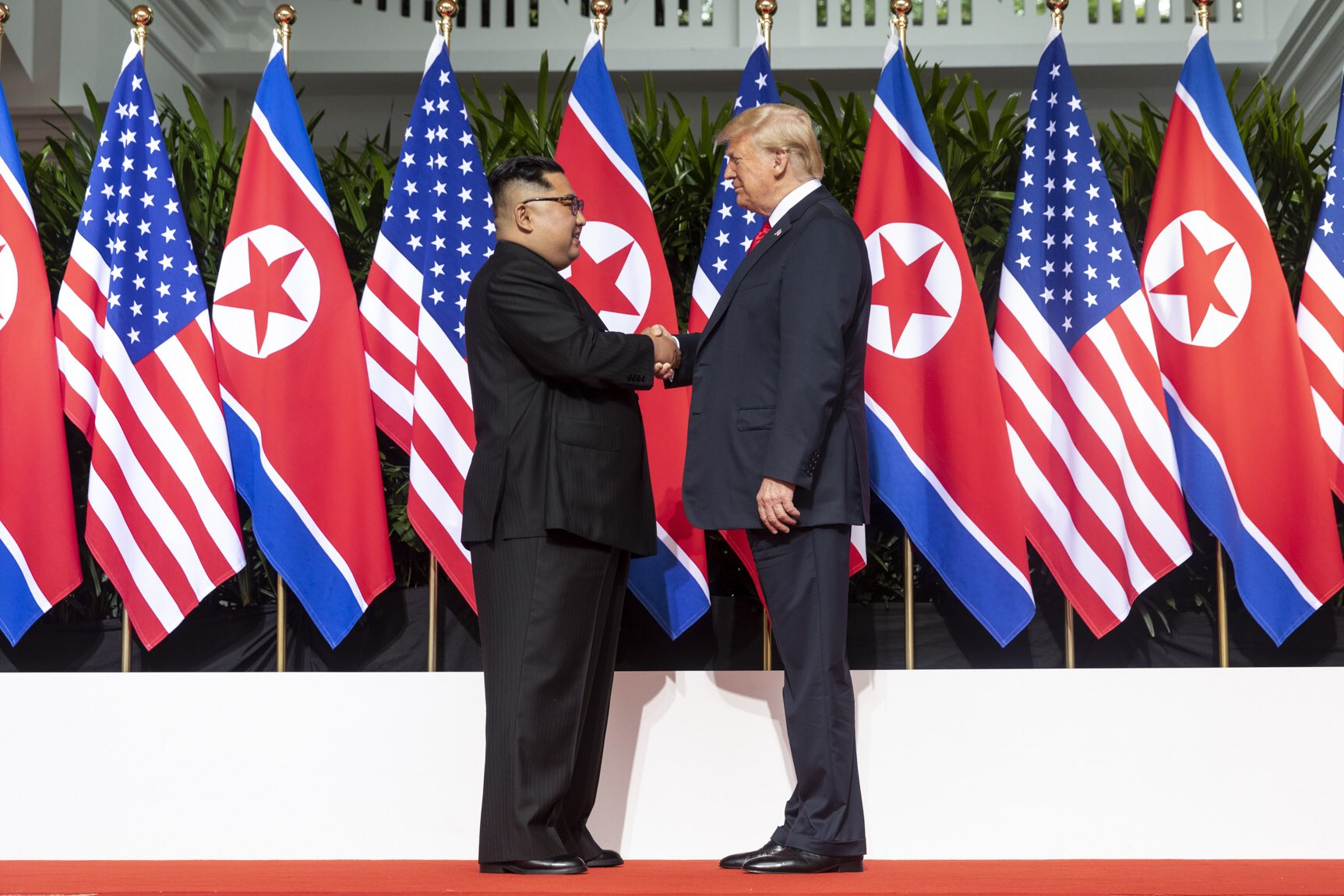
North Korean leader Kim Jong-un and U.S. President Donald Trump meet during the first North Korea–United States summit in Singapore, June 2018

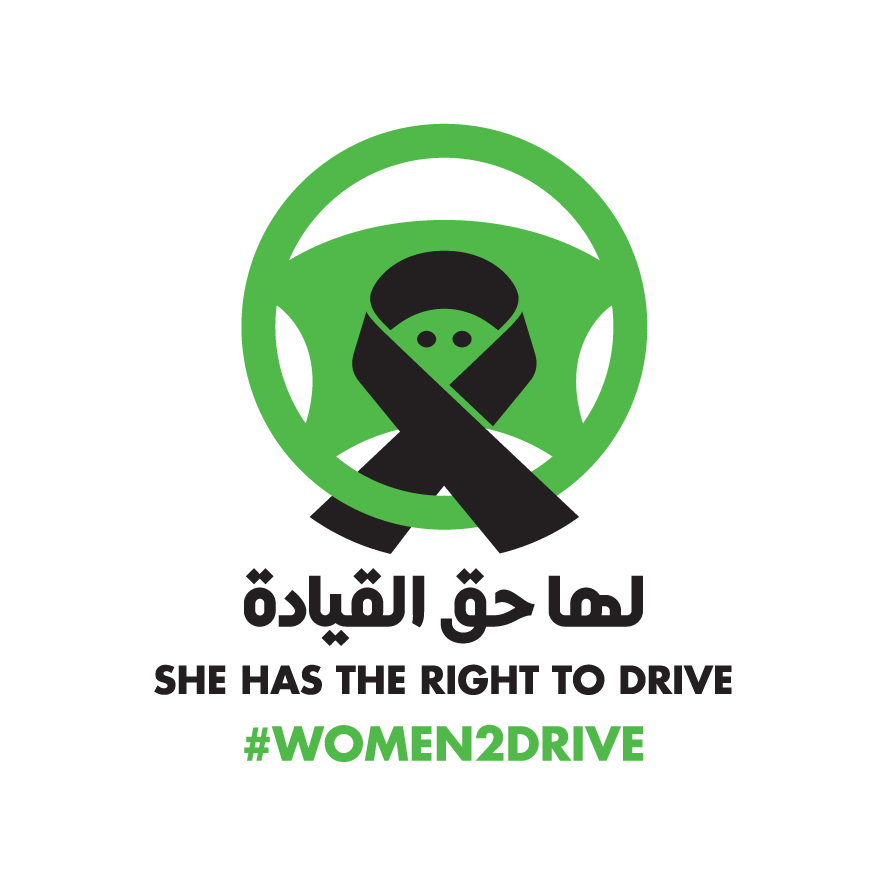
Women to drive movement: Women's rights in Saudi Arabia made progress when women were allowed to drive in the kingdom in 2018.

==== Europe ====
Event	Country	Date	Description	References
Resignation of Silvio Berlusconi	Italy	16 November 2011	The longest-serving prime minister of Italy, Silvio Berlusconi, resigned in November 2011, after a sexual allegation scandal, a financial crisis and public protests. The economist Mario Monti was appointed new prime minister, at the head of a technocratic cabinet.	
2012 French presidential election	France	22 April 2012	François Hollande was elected as the new President of France, becoming the first socialist president of the country in 17 years.	
Resignation of Pope Benedict XVI and papal inauguration of Pope Francis	Vatican City	28 February – 19 March 2013	Benedict XVI resigned as pope, the first to do so since Gregory XII in 1415, and the first to do so voluntarily since Celestine V in 1294. On 13 March, after a papal conclave, Jorge Mario Bergoglio is inaugurated as Pope Francis, the first Jesuit pope, the first pope from the Americas, and the first non-European Pope in over 500 years.	
2013 Italian presidential election	Italy	20 April 2013	Amid growing financial tensions, Italian President Giorgio Napolitano was re-elected, the first ever Italian president to be re-elected. Napolitano appointed Enrico Letta Prime Minister, at the head of a grand coalition.	
2014 Russian annexation of Crimea	Ukraine	18 March 2014	Russia annexed the Crimean peninsula from Ukraine following an internationally unrecognised referendum on the status of the region.	
2014 Scottish independence referendum	Scotland	18 September 2014	In a referendum called by the governing Scottish National Party, Scotland voted to remain in the United Kingdom, with 55.3% of votes against independence while 44.7% voted in favour.	
Abdication of Juan Carlos I of Spain	Spain	19 June 2014	King Juan Carlos I of Spain abdicated in favour of his son, Felipe VI.	
2015 Irish constitutional referendums	Ireland	23 May 2015	The Republic of Ireland voted to legalise same-sex marriage, becoming the first country to legalise same-sex marriage by popular vote.	
Adoption of the Paris Agreement	United Nations	12 December 2015	A historic agreement aimed at keeping global warming below 2 °C compared to pre-industrial levels and reducing greenhouse gas emissions is adopted by all 195 UNFCCC member states.	
2016 United Kingdom European Union membership referendum	United Kingdom	23 June 2016	In a referendum held in the United Kingdom on whether or not to continue being a member of the European Union, 52% of voters chose to leave it. Prime Minister David Cameron announced his resignation afterwards, being succeeded by Theresa May.	
2016 Austrian presidential election	Austria	4 December 2016	Independent green Alexander Van der Bellen narrowly beat the far-right Freedom Party of Austria candidate Norbert Hofer in a repeat of the 2016 Austrian presidential election after the first election was annulled.	
2017 French presidential election	France	7 May 2017	En Marche! candidate Emmanuel Macron was elected the President of France, replacing incumbent Hollande and defeating National Front candidate Marine Le Pen in the second round of voting. Macron is the youngest president in the history of the French Fifth Republic.	
2017 Spanish constitutional crisis	Spain	6 September 2017	Political conflict sparks between the Spanish and the Catalan governments over the 2017 Catalan independence referendum. It still went ahead, with 91% of voters supporting independence within Catalonia, with unionists and Spain opposing the vote. On 27 October, Catalonia declares independence from Spain but it is not recognised by any sovereign nation, while Madrid imposes direct rule for 6 months.	
2018 Italian general election	Italy	4 March 2018	The centre-right alliance, in which the right-wing populist League emerged as the main political force, won a plurality of seats in the Chamber of Deputies and in the Senate, while the anti-establishment Five Star Movement became the party with the largest number of votes. After months of negotiations, the two populist parties, M5S and League, formed a government.	
2019 European Parliament election	European Union	23–26 May 2019	The first European Parliamentary election following the European migrant crisis and the vote for Brexit saw large anti-establishment gains by the Greens-European Free Alliance and by Right-Wing Eurosceptic Parties within Identity and Democracy and European Conservatives and Reformists, such as League in Italy, Alternative for Germany, and National Rally in France. Other populist gains were seen in the success of the Brexit Party in the United Kingdom and the Five Star Movement in Italy.	
2019 United Kingdom general election	United Kingdom	12 December 2019	After an extended period of political deadlock over how to proceed with leaving the European Union an early general election took place in the United Kingdom in which the pro-withdrawal Conservative party, led by new prime minister Boris Johnson, won a sizeable majority of seats effectively guaranteeing Brexit would take place in January the following year.	

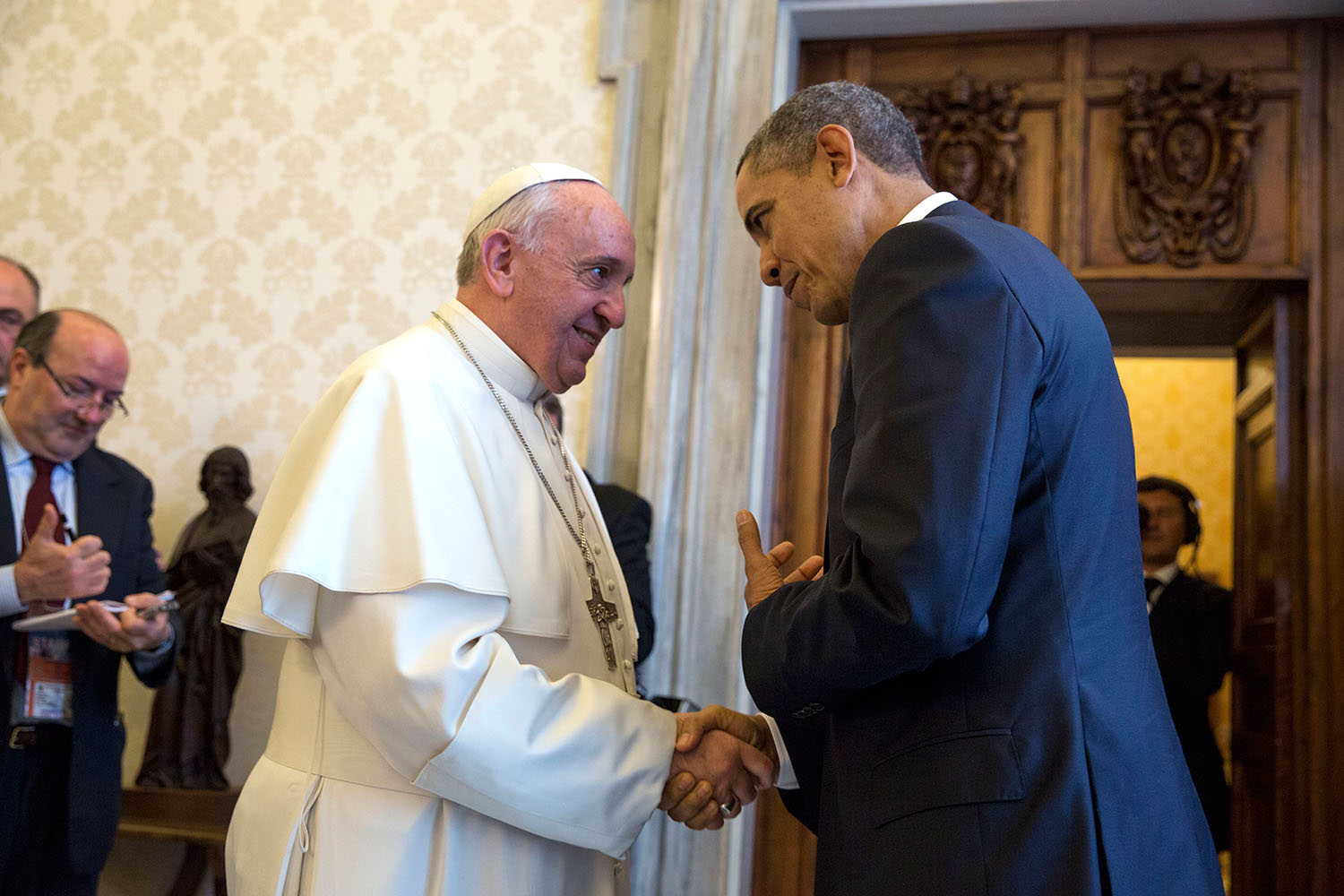
Pope Francis with U.S. President Barack Obama, 2014

28 February 2014: following the removal of pro-Russian Ukrainian president Viktor Yanukovych from office, Russia annexed the Crimean Peninsula from Ukraine

Syrian and Iraqi refugees arriving in Greece. In the 2010s Europe had been severely affected by a huge migration from Africa and Middle East

== Assassinations and attempts ==
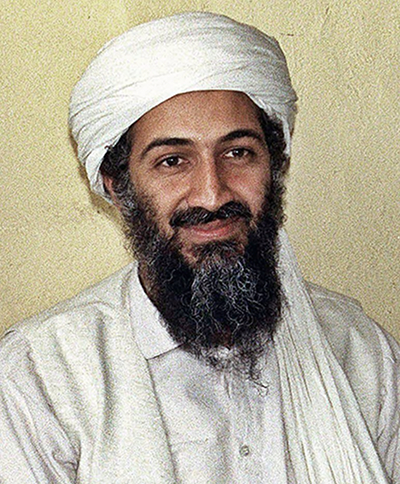
Osama bin Laden

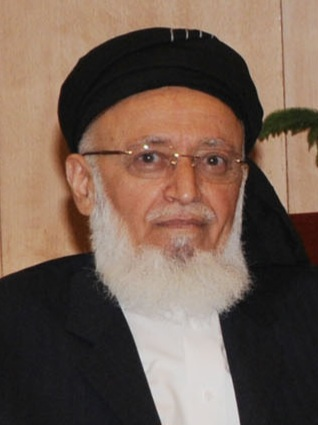
Burhanuddin Rabbani

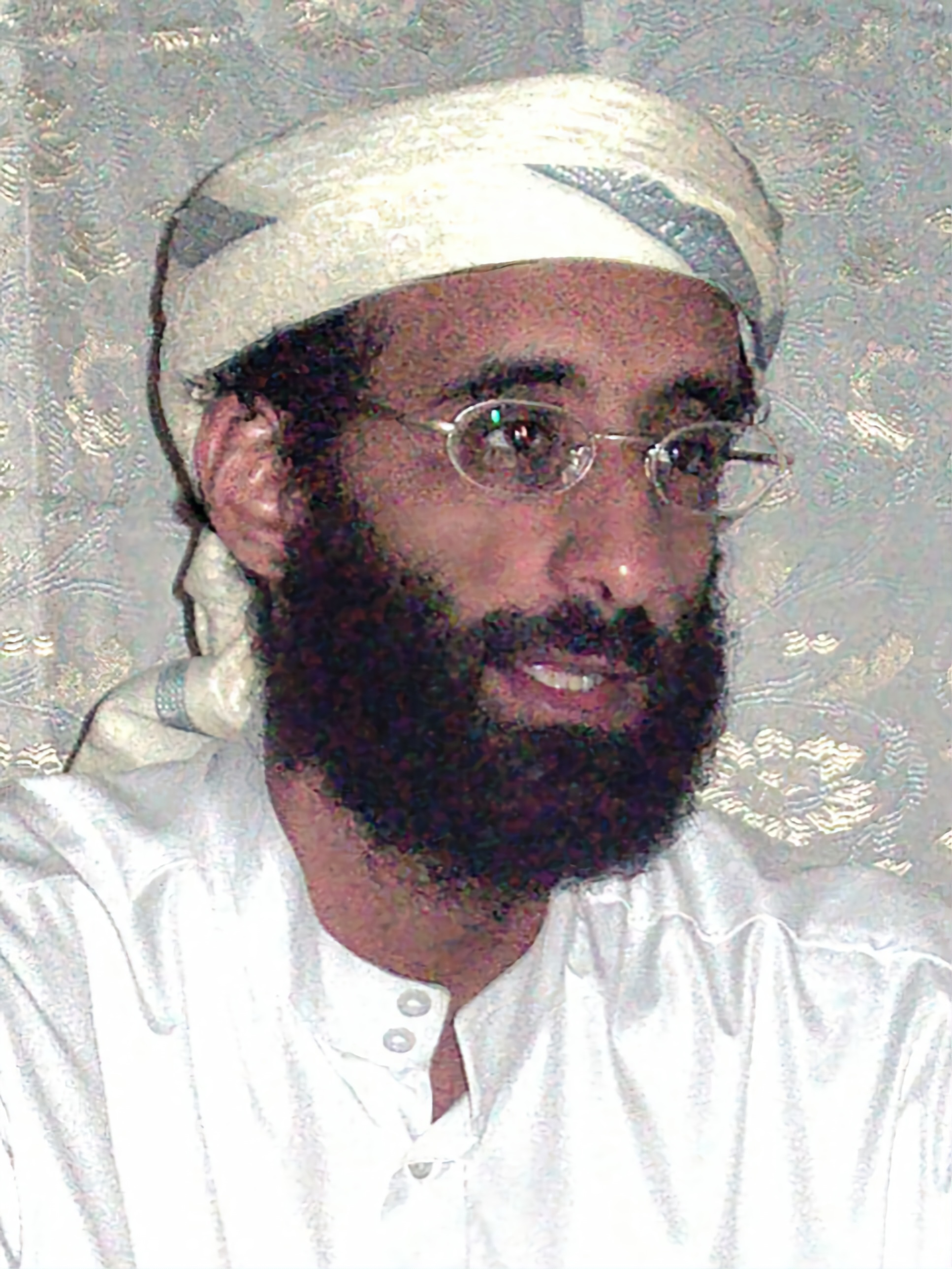
Anwar al-Awlaki

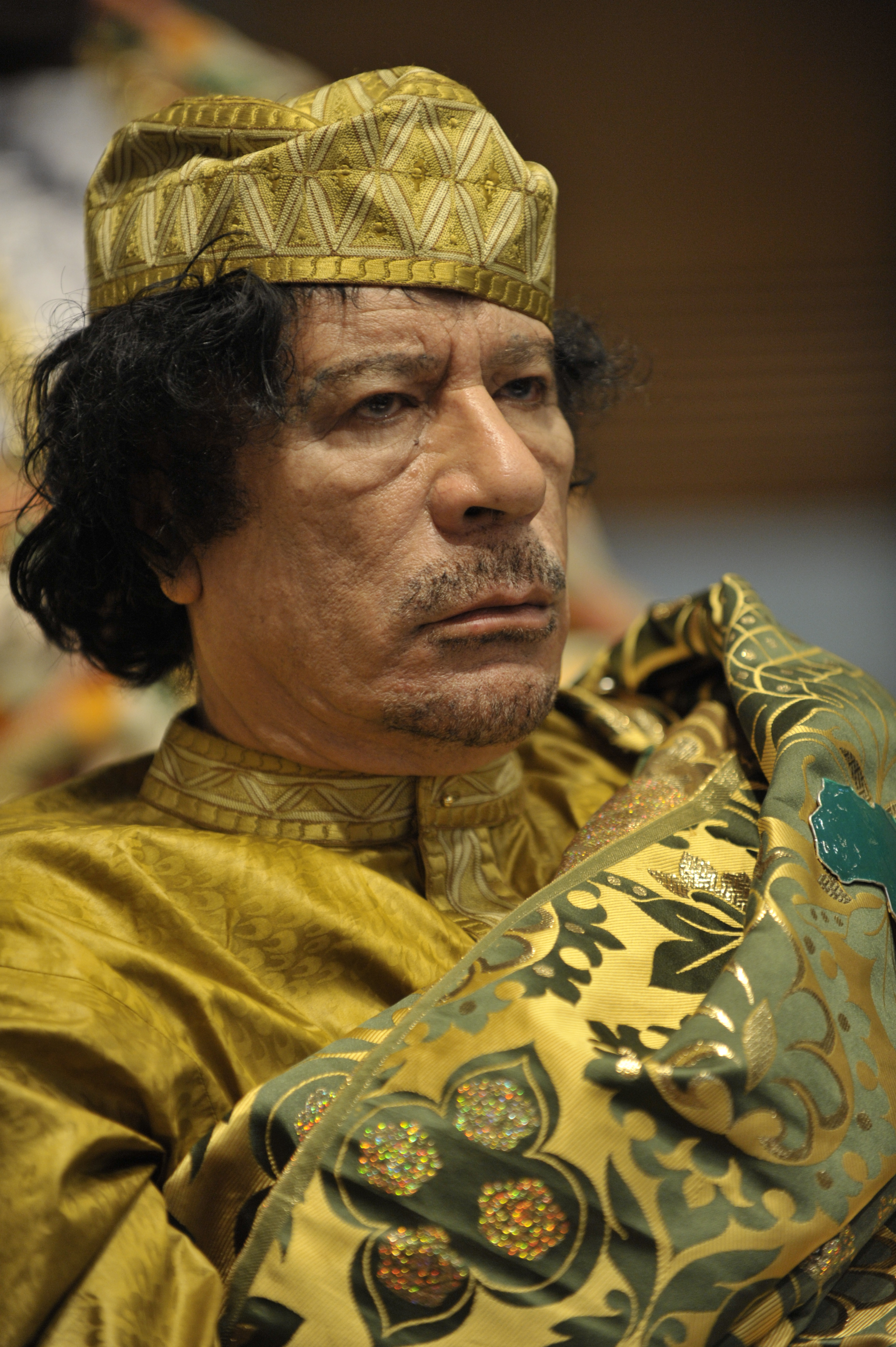
Muammar Gaddafi

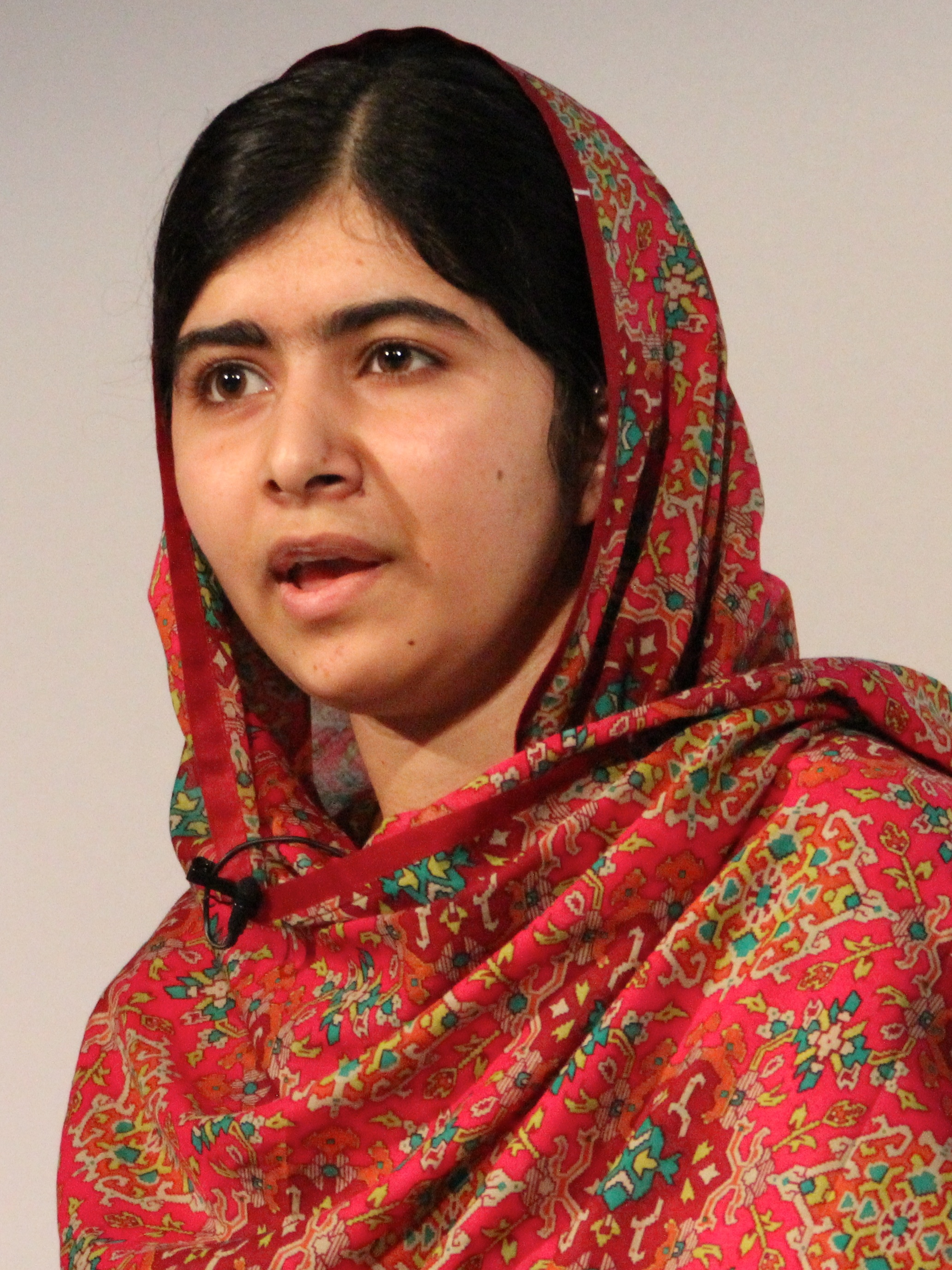
Malala Yousafzai

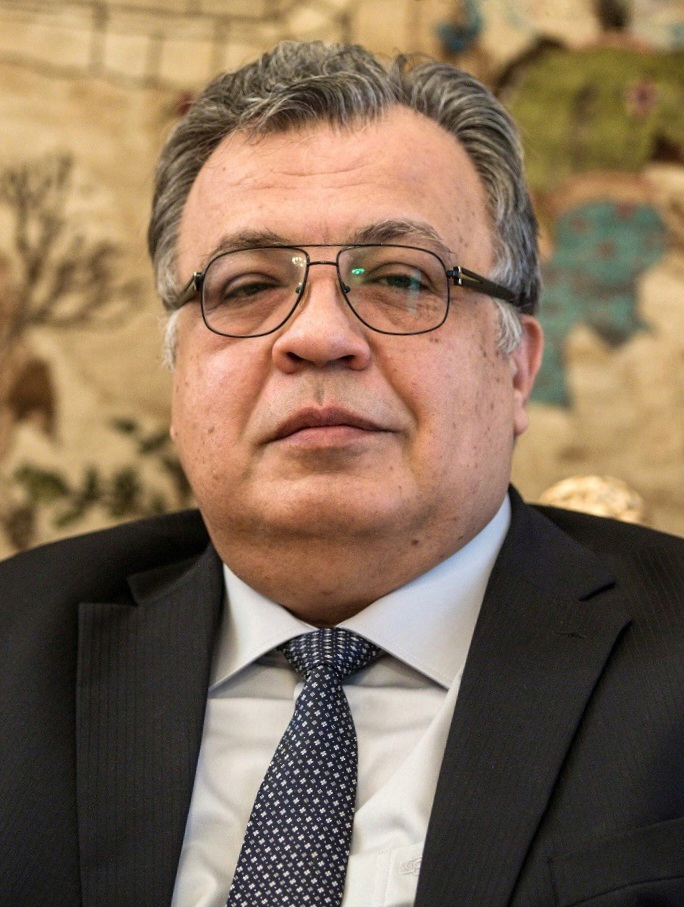
Andrei Karlov

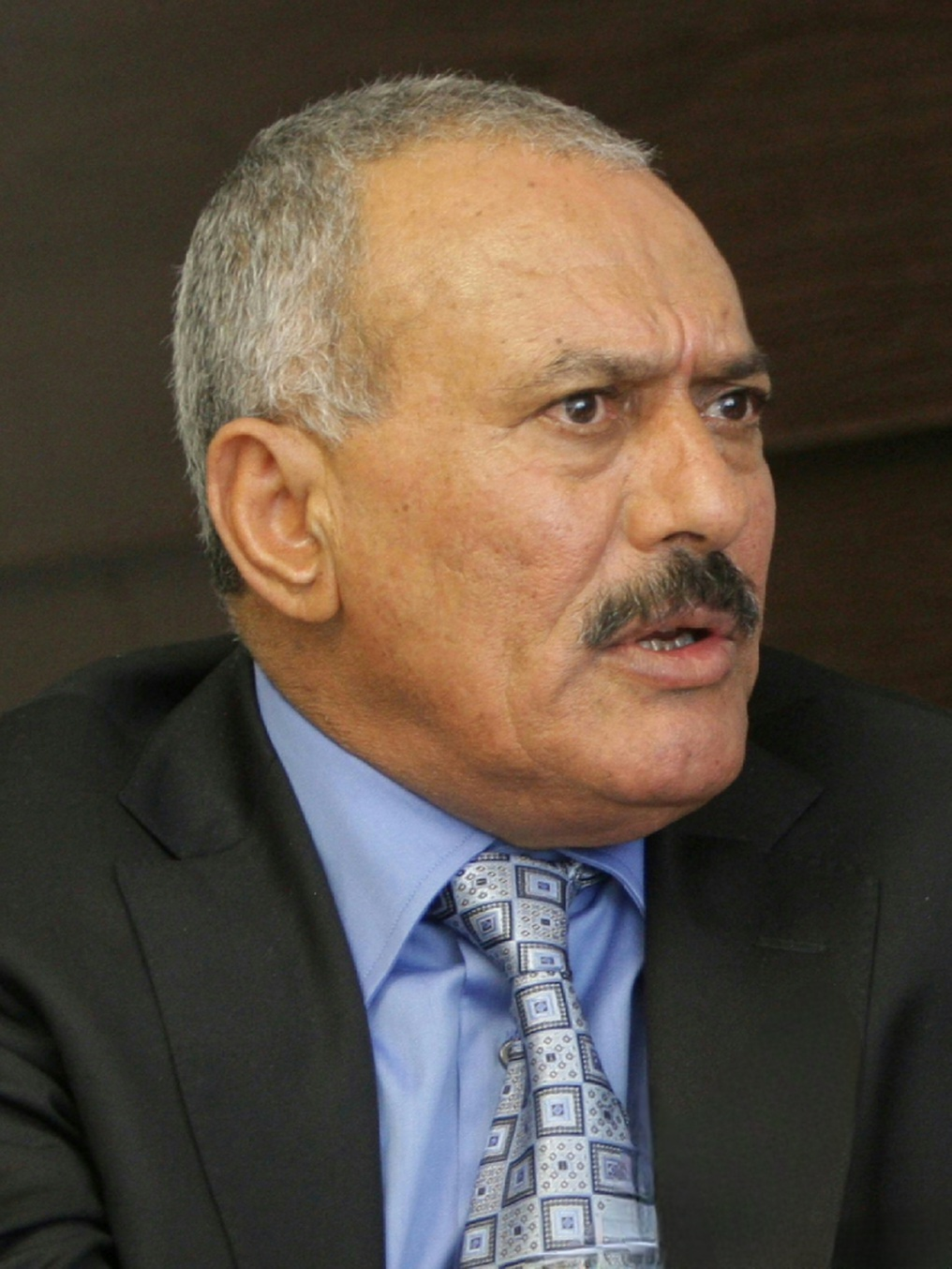
Ali Abdullah Saleh

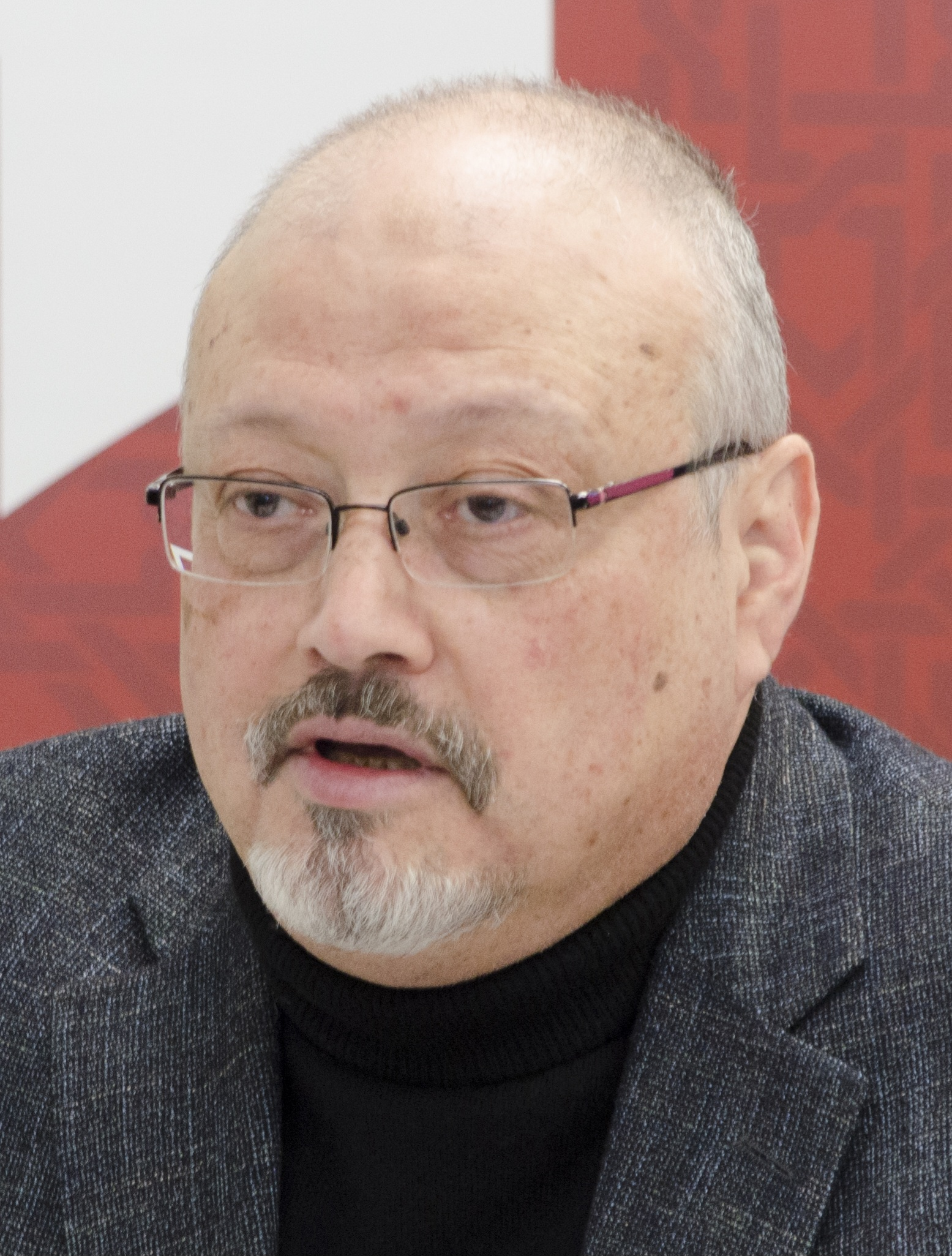
Jamal Khashoggi

Prominent assassinations, targeted killings, and assassination attempts include: 8

Event	Country	Date	Description
2011 Tucson shooting	United States	8 January 2011	United States Federal judge John Roll and 5 others were killed and 13 more were injured in a shooting near Tucson, Arizona. The apparent target, U.S. Representative Gabby Giffords, was critically injured in the head.
Killing of Osama bin Laden	Pakistan	2 May 2011	Osama bin Laden, the founder and leader of the militant Islamist group Al-Qaeda, was killed in a targeted killing in Abbottabad, Pakistan in an operation conducted by a team of United States Navy SEAL commandos.
	Afghanistan	20 September 2011	Burhanuddin Rabbani, Afghan politician and teacher who served as president of Afghanistan from 1992 to 1996, and again from November to December 2001. He was assassinated on his 71st birthday by a suicide bomber entering his home in Kabul.
	Yemen	30 September 2011	Anwar al-Awlaki, a senior talent recruiter, planner and spiritual leader of al-Qaeda, was killed in a targeted killing in the northern al-Jawf province of Yemen, in a drone strike.
Killing of Muammar Gaddafi	Libya	20 October 2011	Muammar Gaddafi, leader of Libya, was shot to death in Sirte.
2012 Montreal shooting	Canada	4 September 2012	Pauline Marois, Premier-designate of Quebec, escaped death during her victory speech after Richard Henry Bain opened fire at the Metropolis in Montreal, killing one person and critically injuring another.
	Pakistan	9 October 2012	Malala Yousafzai, Pakistani women's rights activist, was the survivor of an assassination attempt by the Pakistani Taliban in Pakistan.
Assassination of Mohamad Chatah	Lebanon	27 December 2013	Mohamad Chatah, Lebanese economist and diplomat, was assassinated by a car bomb struck Chatah's convoy in the Central District of Beirut, Lebanon. The bombing killed a total of eight people, among them Chatah, and injured seventy others.
Assassination of Boris Nemtsov	Russia	27 February 2015	Boris Nemtsov, Russian physicist, statesman and opposition politician, was assassinated on the Bolshoy Moskvoretsky Bridge, Central Moscow, Russia, within sight of the Kremlin.
Murder of Jo Cox	United Kingdom	16 June 2016	Jo Cox, British MP, was shot and stabbed to death by a Neo-Nazi white supremacist in Birstall, England. She was the first British MP assassinated in over a quarter of a century and the first female politician in Britain to be assassinated.
Assassination of Andrei Karlov	Turkey	19 December 2016	Andrei Karlov, the Russian ambassador to Turkey, was shot to death by an off duty police officer at an art gallery in Ankara.
Assassination of Kim Jong-nam	Malaysia	13 February 2017	Kim Jong-nam, eldest son of the late Kim Jong-il, was assassinated by two women in Malaysia with a VX nerve agent.
Congressional baseball shooting	United States	14 June 2017	Steve Scalise, an American Congressman, is shot and injured during practice ahead of the annual Congressional Baseball Game in Alexandria, Virginia by a man who held grievances against the Republican party. Three others are also injured.
Battle of Sanaa (2017)	Yemen	4 December 2017	Ali Abdullah Saleh, Yemeni politician who served as the first President of the Republic of Yemen, he was killed on his way to Marib while trying to flee into Saudi-controlled territories after a rocket-propelled grenade struck and disabled his vehicle in an ambush and he was subsequently shot in the head by a Houthi sniper, something his party denied.
Poisoning of Sergei and Yulia Skripal	United Kingdom	4 March 2018	Sergei Skripal, a former Russian double agent, was poisoned alongside his daughter Yulia in the city of Salisbury with a Novichok agent.
Assassination of Antonio Halili	Philippines	2 July 2018	Antonio Halili, Mayor of Tanauan, Batangas, was assassinated by an unidentified gunman while attending a flag raising ceremony together with around 300 government employees and newly elected barangay officials.
Attempted assassination of Jair Bolsonaro	Brazil	6 September 2018	Jair Bolsonaro, federal deputy and Brazilian presidential candidate, survived a stabbing at a campaign rally in Juiz de Fora, Minas Gerais.
Assassination of Jamal Khashoggi	Turkey	2 October 2018	Jamal Khashoggi, Saudi Arabian dissident and journalist for The Washington Post, was assassinated in the Saudi Arabian consulate by the Saudi Government in Istanbul, Turkey in what is widely believed to have been ordered directly by Crown Prince Mohammed bin Salman.
Assassination of Paweł Adamowicz	Poland	13 January 2019	Paweł Adamowicz, Mayor of the city of Gdańsk, was stabbed during a live charity event in Gdańsk by a former inmate. He died the following day.

== Disasters ==
=== Non-natural disasters ===
==== Aviation ====
Event	Date	Country	Description	References
Ethiopian Airlines Flight 409	25 January 2010	Ethiopia	Ethiopian Airlines Flight 409 crashed into the Mediterranean Sea shortly after take-off from Beirut Rafic Hariri International Airport, killing all 90 people on board.	
2010 Polish Air Force Tu-154 crash	10 April 2010	Russia	Polish President Lech Kaczyński and dozens of Polish government and military officials were among 96 people killed when their plane crashed near Smolensk, Russia.	
Afriqiyah Airways Flight 771	12 May 2010	Libya	Afriqiyah Airways Flight 771 crashed on a runway at Tripoli International Airport in Libya, killing all but one of the 104 passengers and crew.	
Air India Express Flight 812	22 May 2010	India	Air India Express Flight 812 overshot the runway at Mangalore International Airport in India, killing 158 people, with eight surviving.	
Airblue Flight 202	28 July 2010	Pakistan	Airblue Flight 202 en route from Karachi to Islamabad crashed in the Margalla Hills near Islamabad, killing all 152 aboard, becoming the deadliest air crash in Pakistan's history.	
Dana Air Flight 992	3 June 2012	Nigeria	Dana Air Flight 992 crashed in the Nigerian city of Lagos, killing all 153 people aboard. 10 people on the ground also perished.	
Asiana Airlines Flight 214	6 July 2013	United States	Asiana Airlines Flight 214 crashed at San Francisco International Airport killing 3 and injuring 181 people.	
Malaysia Airlines Flight 370	8 March 2014	Malaysia	Malaysia Airlines Flight 370 vanished en route from Kuala Lumpur to Beijing. The bulk of the plane is still missing, with all 239 people on board presumed dead. The first remains of the aircraft were found on 29 July 2015, after they washed ashore on Réunion Island.	
Malaysia Airlines Flight 17	17 July 2014	Malaysia	Malaysia Airlines Flight 17 was shot down over Donetsk Oblast, Ukraine and crashed near the Ukrainian-Russian border, killing all 298 people on board, making it the deadliest airliner shoot down in history.	
Air Algérie Flight 5017	24 July 2014	Mali	Air Algérie Flight 5017 crashed in southern Mali, killing all 116 passengers and crew.	
Indonesia AirAsia Flight 8501	28 December 2014	Indonesia	Indonesia AirAsia Flight 8501 crashed in the Java sea after an attempt to avoid heavy thunderstorms, leaving all 162 people dead.	
Germanwings Flight 9525	24 March 2015	France	Germanwings Flight 9525 crashed in the French Alps, killing all 150 on board.	
2015 Indonesian Air Force Lockheed C-130 Hercules crash	30 June 2015	Indonesia	A Lockheed C-130 Hercules operated by the Indonesian Air Force crashed into a crowded residential neighbourhood in Medan shortly after take-off from Soewondo Air Force Base, killing 143 people including 22 on the ground, making it the deadliest crash in Indonesian Air Force peacetime history.	
Metrojet Flight 9268	31 October 2015	Egypt	Metrojet Flight 9268, an Airbus A321 airliner en route to Saint Petersburg from Sharm el-Sheikh, crashes near Al-Hasana in Sinai, killing all 224 passengers and crew on board.	
LaMia Flight 2933	29 November 2016	Colombia	A chartered Avro RJ85 plane carrying 77 people, including the Chapecoense football team, crashes near Medellín, Colombia. Six of the passengers survived. The 2016 Copa Sudamericana Finals were suspended, and Atlético Nacional, Chapecoense's to-be opponents, gave them the trophy out of respect.	
2016 Russian Defence Ministry Tupolev Tu-154 crash	25 December 2016	Russia	A Tupolev Tu-154 crashes near Sochi, Russia, killing all 92 people on board, including 64 members of the Alexandrov Ensemble.	
Iran Aseman Airlines Flight 3704	18 February 2018	Iran	Iran Aseman Airlines Flight 3704 crashes in the Zagros Mountains, en route from Tehran to Yasuj. All 65 passengers and crew members perish.	
Cubana de Aviación Flight 972	18 May 2018	Cuba	Cubana de Aviación Flight 972 crashes shortly after take-off near José Martí International Airport in Havana, killing 112 and leaving only one survivor.	
Lion Air Flight 610	29 October 2018	Indonesia	Lion Air Flight 610 crashes off the coast of Java, with 189 passengers on board.	
Ethiopian Airlines Flight 302	10 March 2019	Ethiopia	Ethiopian Airlines Flight 302, a Boeing 737 MAX 8 bound for Nairobi, crashes shortly after takeoff from Addis Ababa killing all 157 people on board.	
Aeroflot Flight 1492	5 May 2019	Russia	Aeroflot Flight 1492 makes a hard landing, causing fire and partial destruction at Sheremetyevo International Airport, Moscow, killing 41 of the 78 people on board.	

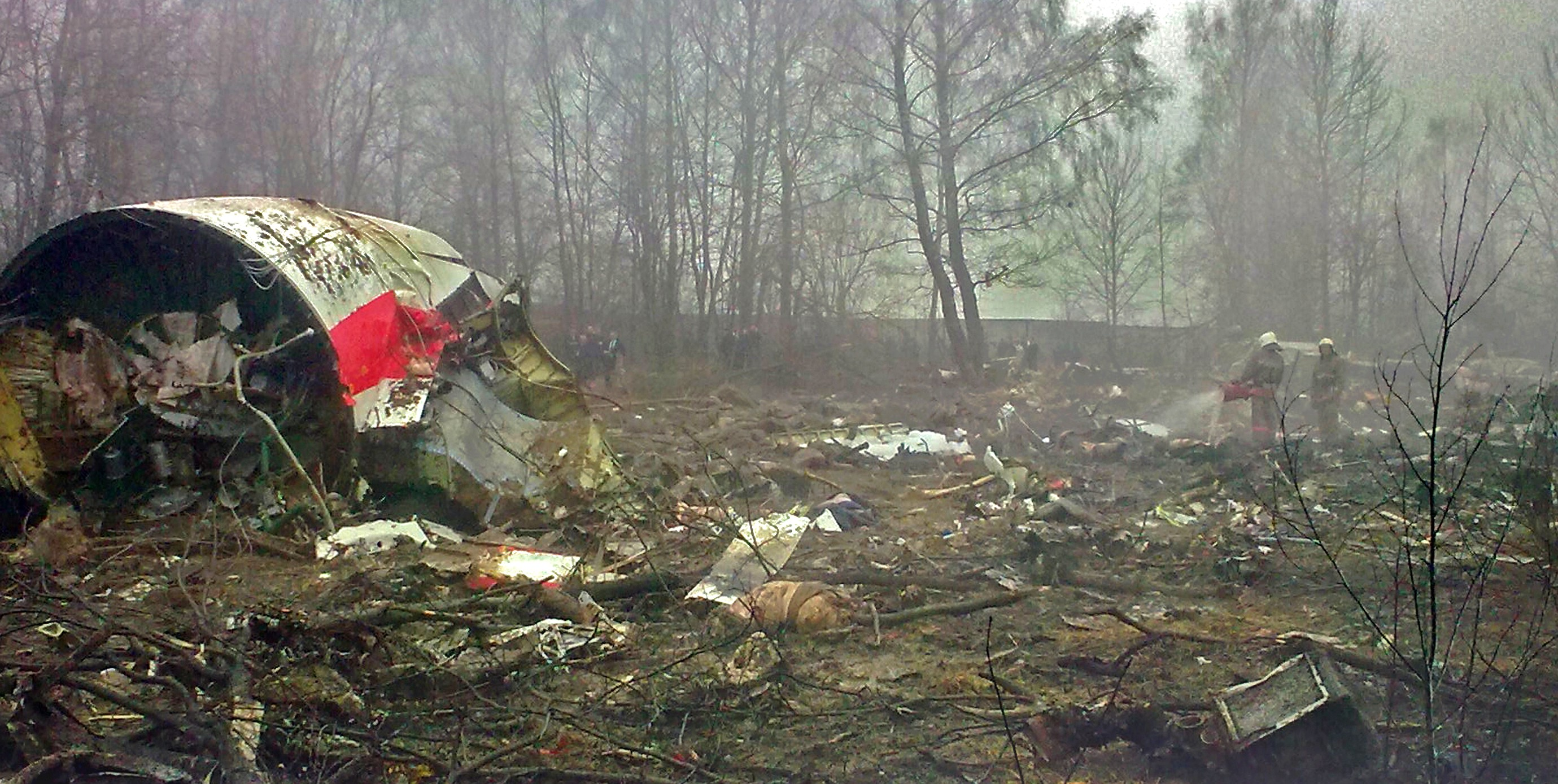
On 10 April 2010 a Tupolev Tu-154 aircraft of the Polish Air Force crashed in Russia with the Polish President Lech Kaczynski and 95 other passengers including many senior officials

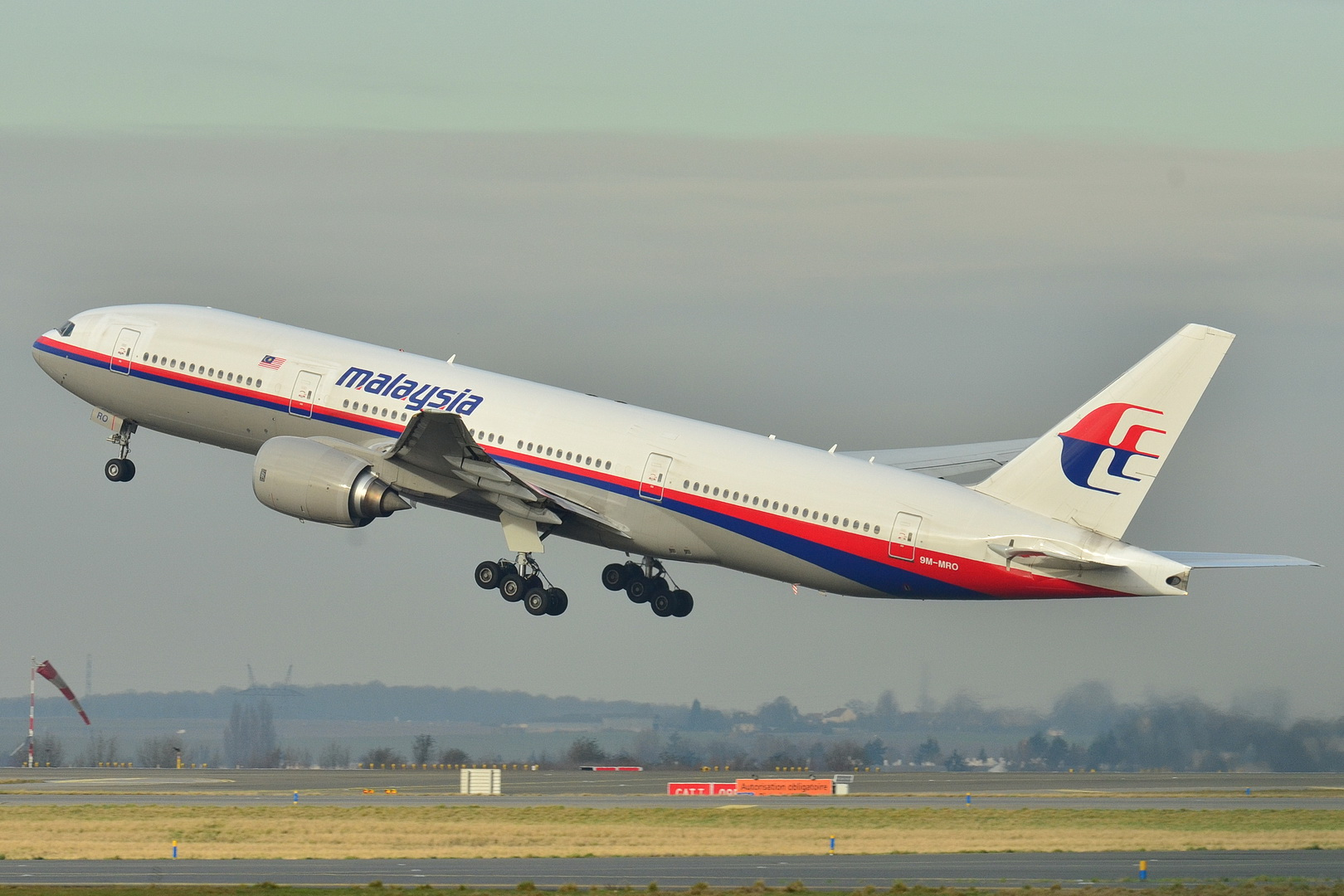
For over 15 months it was unclear what exactly happened to Malaysia Airlines Flight 370 until at the end of July 2015 a few remnants of the plane swept to the shores of the island of Réunion

==== General ====
Event	Date	Country	Description	References
2010 Copiapó mining accident	13 October 2010	Chile	Thirty-three miners near Copiapó, Chile, were trapped 700 metres (2,300 feet) underground in a mining accident in San José Mine, before being rescued after surviving for a record 69 days.	
2013 Savar building collapse	24 April 2013	Bangladesh	An eight-story factory building collapsed in the outskirts of Dhaka, Bangladesh, killing 1,129 people and injuring over 2,000 more, becoming the deadliest structural failure in history.	
2015 Tianjin explosions	12 August 2015	China	Two explosions occurred within 30 seconds of each other at a container storage station at the Port of Tianjin in the Binhai New Area of Tianjin, China, killing at least 173.	
Mecca crane collapse	11 September 2015	Saudi Arabia	A crane toppled over at Mecca, killing 111 people, weeks before the official Hajj pilgrimage.	
2015 Mina crowd crush	24 September 2015	Saudi Arabia	A human crush during the Hajj pilgrimage in Mecca, Saudi Arabia, killed at least 2,236 people, making it the deadliest Hajj disaster in history.	
Bento Rodrigues dam disaster	5 November 2015	Brazil	An iron ore tailings dam in Bento Rodrigues, a subdistrict of Mariana, Brazil, suffered a catastrophic failure, causing flooding and at least 17 deaths. At least 16 people have been injured. This incident has been described as the worst environmental disaster in Brazil's history.	
Tham Luang cave rescue	23 June – 10 July 2018	Thailand	Twelve boys and their football coach are rescued from the flooded Tham Luang Nang Non cave in Thailand, following a 17-day ordeal that gained worldwide attention.	
Ponte Morandi Collapse	14 August 2018	Italy	Part of the Morandi Bridge collapses after a violent storm in Genoa, Italy, causing 43 fatalities. Deputy Prime Minister Luigi Di Maio and transport minister Danilo Toninelli blame private company Autostrade per l'Italia.	
Tlahuelilpan pipeline explosion	18 January 2019	Mexico	A gasoline pipeline exploded in the town of Tlahuelilpan, in the Mexican state of Hidalgo. The blast killed at least 135 people and injured dozens more. Mexican authorities blamed fuel thieves, who had illegally tapped the pipeline.	
2019 Xiangshui chemical plant explosion	21 March 2019	China	A major explosion at a chemical plant in Xiangshui, Jiangsu, China, kills at least 64 people and injures more than 600 others. Its powerful impact registered as an artificial earthquake.	

==== Fires ====
Event	Date	Country	Description	References
Comayagua prison fire	14–15 February 2012	Honduras	A fire at the National Penitentiary in Comayagua, Honduras killed 361 people.	
2012 Dhaka garment factory fire	24 November 2012	Bangladesh	117 people were confirmed dead in a garment factory fire, and over 200 were injured, making it the deadliest factory fire in the nation's history.	
Kiss nightclub fire	27 January 2013	Brazil	242 people were killed in a fire at a nightclub in Santa Maria, Brazil.	
Colectiv nightclub fire	30 October 2015	Romania	64 people were killed in a fire at a nightclub in Bucharest, Romania.	
Ghost Ship warehouse fire	2 December 2016	United States	36 were killed in an artists' live-and-work collective in an Oakland, CA accident due to substandard wiring.	
Grenfell Tower fire	14 June 2017	United Kingdom	A fire ignited by a faulty refrigerator in a London council estate tower block spread to almost the entirety of the building causing 72 deaths and over 70 injuries.	
2018 Kemerovo fire	25 March 2018	Russia	60 people die in a fire at a shopping and entertainment complex in the Russian city of Kemerovo.	
2018 Valencia, Venezuela fire	28 March 2018	Venezuela	At least 78 people die in a fire in the police headquarters of Valencia, Venezuela.	
National Museum of Brazil fire	2 September 2018	Brazil	A fire destroys the National Museum of Brazil in Rio de Janeiro. No one was injured, but 90 percent of the collection was destroyed.	
February 2019 Dhaka fire	20 February 2019	Bangladesh	A major fire in Dhaka, Bangladesh kills at least 78 people.	
Notre-Dame fire	15 April 2019	France	A major fire at the Notre-Dame Cathedral destroyed most of its roof, and its upper walls were severely damaged; extensive damage to the interior was prevented by its stone vaulted ceiling, which largely contained the burning roof as it collapsed. 3 injuries were reported, but there were no confirmed deaths.	

==== Marine ====
Event	Date	Country	Description	References
Costa Concordia disaster	13 January 2012	Italy	The Italian cruise ship Costa Concordia hit a reef and partially capsized off the coast of Isola del Giglio, Italy, killing 32 people.	
Sinking of MV Sewol	16 April 2014	South Korea	South Korean ferry MV Sewol capsized while en route to Jeju, killing 295 people, mostly secondary school students from Danwon High School.	
Sinking of Dongfang zhi Xing	1 June 2015	China	The river cruise ship Dongfang zhi Xing capsized in the Yangtze River after being hit by a waterspout, killing 442 people, making it the deadliest maritime disaster in China's peacetime history.	
Sinking of MV Nyerere	20 September 2018	Tanzania	The MV Nyerere capsizes on Lake Victoria, killing at least 227 passengers.	

==== Pollution ====
Event	Date	Country	Description	References
Deepwater Horizon oil spill	20 April 2010	United States	An explosion on BP's Deepwater Horizon offshore drilling rig, operating in the Gulf of Mexico off the coast of Louisiana, left eleven crewmen dead and resulted in a fire that sank the rig and caused a massive oil spill, becoming the worst environmental disaster in U.S. history.	
Fukushima Daiichi nuclear disaster	11 March 2011	Japan	A magnitude 9.0 earthquake off the coast of Sendai caused a tsunami that severely damaged the Fukushima Daiichi and Fukushima Daini nuclear power plants. The damage resulted in the worst nuclear disaster since the Chernobyl disaster, contaminating the entire area.	
Flint water crisis	25 April 2014	United States	The U.S. city of Flint, Michigan's water source was changed from the treated Detroit Water and Sewerage Department to the Flint River, where officials had failed to apply corrosion inhibitors. This decision led to the water being contaminated by lead and eventual nationwide outrage about an alleged coverup.	

=== Natural disasters ===
==== Earthquakes and tsunamis ====
Event	Date	Country	Description	References
2010 Haiti earthquake	12 January 2010	Haiti	A 7.0 magnitude earthquake hit Haiti, causing widespread destruction in Port-au-Prince. Haitian authorities believe that the disaster killed 316,000 people and over three million more were affected by the quake. The earthquake was the deadliest disaster in the decade.	
2010 Chile earthquake	27 February 2010	Chile	An 8.8 magnitude earthquake occurred in Chile, triggering a tsunami across the Pacific and killing 497. One of the largest earthquakes in recorded history, this rare megathrust earthquake likely shifted Earth's axis and slightly shortened its days.	
2010 Baja California earthquake	4 April 2010	Mexico	A 7.2 magnitude earthquake hit Mexicali and Baja, killing three and injuring more than two hundred. US border towns in Imperial Valley, California were affected.	
2010 Yushu earthquake	13 April 2010	China	A 6.9 magnitude earthquake occurred in western China, killing at least 2,200 and injuring more than 12,000.	
February 2011 Christchurch earthquake	22 February 2011	New Zealand	A 6.3 magnitude earthquake struck Christchurch, New Zealand, killing 185 people.	
2011 Tōhoku earthquake and tsunami	11 March 2011	Japan	A 9.0 magnitude earthquake hit near Sendai, Japan. It created a 133 feet (41 m) high tsunami, leaving 15,893 dead, 2,565 missing and over 150,000 displaced. It was the largest earthquake to hit Japan in 140 years.	
2011 Van earthquake	23 October 2011	Turkey	A 7.1 magnitude earthquake struck the Turkish city of Van, leaving over 604 dead and thousands more injured.	
April 2015 Nepal earthquake	25 April 2015	Nepal	A massive 7.8 magnitude earthquake in Nepal killed at least 8,857 people and injured tens of thousands more. It is the worst disaster to hit Nepal in decades.	
May 2015 Nepal earthquake	12 May 2015	Nepal	A second major earthquake hit Nepal, measuring 7.3 on the moment magnitude scale, killing 218 more people.	
2016 Ecuador earthquake	16 April 2016	Ecuador	A 7.8 earthquake struck near Muisne, Ecuador, killing over 673 people and displacing at least 25,000 more.	
August 2016 Central Italy earthquake	24 August 2016	Italy	A 6.2 magnitude earthquake struck Central Italy near Norcia, 75 km (47 mi) southeast of Perugia and 45 km (28 mi) north of L'Aquila, in an area near the tripoint of the Umbria, Lazio, and Marche regions. At least 299 people were left dead.	
2017 Central Mexico earthquake	19 September 2017	Mexico	A 7.1 magnitude earthquake struck near the city of Puebla. Coincidentally, it was also the 32nd anniversary of the 1985 Mexico City earthquake, which was commemorated with a national seismic alert drill, just two hours before the real earthquake struck, which left 360 dead and over 6,000 injured.	
2018 Sulawesi earthquake and tsunami	28 September 2018	Indonesia	A magnitude 7.5 earthquake hits Sulawesi, Indonesia, causing a tsunami that kills at least 2,256 people and injures more than 540 others.	
2018 Sunda Strait tsunami	22 December 2018	Indonesia	A tsunami hits the Sunda Strait, Indonesia after a volcanic eruption of Anak Krakatoa killing at least 430 people and injuring nearly 1,500.	
2019 Peru earthquake	26 May 2019	Peru	An 8.0 magnitude earthquake struck in Loreto Region, Peru, killing 2 people and injures more than 30 others.	
2019 Albania earthquake	26 November 2019	Albania	A 6.4 magnitude earthquake hits Albania near the cities of Durrës and Tirana, killing 51 people and injuring over 3,000 others.	

==== Tropical cyclones ====
Event	Date	Country	Description	References
Typhoon Megi	18 October 2010	Philippines	Typhoon Megi, known in the Philippines as Super Typhoon Juan, hit the Philippines, killing at least 69 and causing US$709 million in damage.	
Hurricane Irene	22 August 2011	United StatesBahamasTurks and Caicos	Hurricane Irene, the first hurricane and major hurricane of the 2011 Atlantic hurricane season, caused devastation on various islands in the Caribbean and the East Coast of the United States, killing 49 and causing almost $14.2 billion in damages.	
Tropical Storm Washi	16 December 2011	Philippines	Tropical Storm Washi, known in the Philippines as Tropical Storm Sendong, caused catastrophic damage on the Philippine island of Mindanao. More than 1,000 died and thousands were injured or missing.	
Hurricane Sandy	25 October 2012	Various	Hurricane Sandy caused immense destruction in Cuba, Jamaica, Puerto Rico and the United States, leaving at least 233 dead. It became the largest Atlantic tropical storm ever.	
Typhoon Bopha	2 December 2012	Philippines	Typhoon Bopha, known in the Philippines as Typhoon Pablo, struck the Philippines, killing at least 650 people and leaving millions more homeless.	
Typhoon Haiyan	7 November 2013	Philippines	Typhoon Haiyan, known as Super Typhoon Yolanda in the Philippines, hits the Philippines, killing at least 6,000 people, with a thousand more still missing, making it the deadliest typhoon to ever hit the Philippines.	
Hurricane Joaquin	28 September 2015 – 7 October 2015	United StatesCubaBahamasBermudaTurks and Caicos Islands	Hurricane Joaquin was a powerful tropical cyclone that devastated several districts of the Bahamas and caused damage in the Turks and Caicos Islands, parts of the Greater Antilles, and Bermuda.	
Typhoon Melor	13 December 2015	Philippines	Typhoon Melor, known in the Philippines as Typhoon Nona, hits the Philippines, killing 42 and causing $136 million in damages.	
Cyclone Winston	20 February 2016	Fiji	Cyclone Winston struck Fiji, killing 44 people and causing $1.4 billion in damages, making it the costliest tropical cyclone in South Pacific history.	
Hurricane Matthew	28 September 2016 – 9 October 2016	United StatesCubaHaitiJamaicaDominican RepublicBahamas	Hurricane Matthew caused catastrophic damage and a humanitarian crisis in Haiti, as well as widespread devastation in the southeastern United States. The deadliest Atlantic hurricane since Hurricane Stan in 2005, it caused extensive damage to landmasses in the Greater Antilles, severe damage in several islands of the Bahamas and was responsible for 603 fatalities.	
Hurricane Harvey	23 August 2017	United States	Hurricane Harvey slams into southeastern Texas after reorganising over the Gulf of Mexico, causing catastrophic flooding and billions in damages. It became the first major hurricane to make landfall in the United States since Hurricane Wilma in 2005. Total damage from the hurricane was estimated at $125 billion, making it the costliest natural disaster ever in the United States, tied with 2005's Hurricane Katrina.	
Hurricane Irma	30 August 2017 – 16 September 2017	Antigua and Barbuda Cuba United States	Hurricane Irma, an extremely powerful and catastrophic Cape Verde-type hurricane, the strongest observed in the Atlantic since Wilma in 2005 in terms of maximum sustained winds. It was the first Category 5 hurricane to strike the Leeward Islands on record. The storm caused catastrophic damage in Barbuda, Saint Barthélemy, Saint Martin, Anguilla, and the Virgin Islands as a Category 5 hurricane.	
Hurricane Maria	16 September 2017 – 3 October 2017	Puerto RicoDominica	Hurricane Maria is regarded as the worst natural disaster on record in Dominica, and caused catastrophic damage and a major humanitarian crisis in Puerto Rico. The third costliest Atlantic hurricane to date, it caused catastrophic damage and thousands of fatalities across the northeastern Caribbean, compounding recovery efforts in areas still damaged from Hurricane Irma just two weeks prior.	
Typhoon Mangkhut	15 September 2018	Philippines	Typhoon Mangkhut, known in the Philippines as Typhoon Ompong, hits northern Luzon, triggering deadly landslides and killing at least 95 people.	
Hurricane Michael	7 October 2018 – 16 October 2018	United StatesCuba	Hurricane Michael was the first Category 5 hurricane to strike the contiguous United States since Andrew in 1992. In addition, it was the third-most intense Atlantic hurricane to make landfall in the contiguous United States in terms of pressure, behind the 1935 Labor Day hurricane and Hurricane Camille of 1969. It was the first Category 5 hurricane on record to impact the Florida Panhandle, and was the fourth-strongest landfalling hurricane in the contiguous United States, in terms of wind speed. Michael was responsible for 74 deaths.	
Hurricane Dorian	24 August 2019 – 10 September 2019	The Bahamas United States	Hurricane Dorian was one of the strongest Atlantic hurricanes in years, and also is tied as the strongest landfalling Atlantic hurricane since the 1935 Labor Day Hurricane. Dorian also became the worst natural disaster in all of the Bahamas' history, killing over 73 people and causing over US$4.68 billion in damage, with US$3.4 billion of damage in The Bahamas alone after the storm stalled over Grand Bahama at incredible Category 5 intensity. The storm also caused 1.2 billion dollars of damage in the United States after making landfall near Cape Hatteras, North Carolina.	

==== Tornadoes ====
Event	Date	Country	Description	References
2011 Super Outbreak	25–28 April 2011	United States Canada	A tornado outbreak in the United States and Canada killed 324 people across six states. At 360 tornadoes, it was the largest and one of the deadliest tornado outbreaks in United States history.	
21–26 May 2011 tornado outbreak sequence	21 May 2011	United States	Another U.S. tornado outbreak took place over six days. 178 people were killed, most of which occurred in Joplin, Missouri after an EF5 tornado swept through the city, killing 158 people and injuring at least 1,150.	
2019 Nepal tornado	31 March 2019	Nepal	A tornado struck the Bara and Parsa districts of Nepal, killing 28 and injuring 1,176 people. It is the first officially recorded tornado in Nepalese history.	

==== Floods, avalanches, and mudslides ====
Event	Date	Country	Description	References
2010 Pakistan floods	July 2010	Pakistan	Flooding occurred in Pakistan after record monsoon rains, killing at least 1,600 people, thousands were rendered homeless, and more than thirteen million people were affected. Estimates from rescue service officials suggest the death toll might have reached 3,000.	
January 2011 Rio de Janeiro floods and mudslides	11 January 2011	Brazil	Floods and mudslides killed 903 people across the state of Rio de Janeiro, Brazil.	
2013 Alberta floods	19 June 2013	Canada	Massive flooding occurred in Alberta, becoming the province's worst flooding in decades.	
2014 Southeast Europe floods	13–27 May 2014	Serbia Bosnia and Herzegovina Croatia Romania	Between 13 and 18 May 2014 a low pressure cyclone designated "Tamara" and "Yvette" affected a large area of Southeastern and Central Europe, causing floods and landslides. Serbia and Bosnia and Herzegovina suffered the greatest damage as the rain was the heaviest in 120 years of recorded weather measurements. At least 86 people were killed and hundreds of thousands had been forced from their homes. Assessments of damage range up to 3.5 billion euros for Serbia, Bosnia and Herzegovina.	
2015 Afghanistan avalanches	24 February 2015	Afghanistan	An avalanche killed 310 people and wounded over 129 in Panjshir Province, Afghanistan.	
2015 South Indian floods	8 November 2015	India	Heavy rainfall generated by the annual northeast monsoon affected the Coromandel Coast region of the South Indian states of Tamil Nadu and Andhra Pradesh. More than 500 people were killed and over 1.8 million people were displaced. With estimates of damages and losses ranging from nearly ₹200 billion (US$3 billion) to over ₹1 trillion (US$14 billion), the floods were the costliest to have occurred in 2015, and were among the costliest natural disasters of the year.	

==== Volcanic eruptions ====
Event	Date	Country	Description	References
2010 eruptions of Eyjafjallajökull	20 March 2010	Iceland	Eruptions of the Eyjafjallajökull volcano in Iceland caused unprecedented disruption to international air travel, rendering transatlantic flight impossible and closing airways across much of Europe. The event was the largest air traffic shut-down since World War II.	
2010 eruptions of Mount Merapi	Early November 2010	Indonesia	Mount Merapi erupted in Indonesia, killing 353 people and grounding flights across Southeast Asia, becoming the largest eruption from the mountain in a century.	
2018 lower Puna eruption	3 May 2018	United States	A lava flow erupted in Hawai'i from Kīlauea's east rift zone, causing much damage and resulting in evacuation orders.	
2018 Volcán de Fuego eruption	3 June 2018	Guatemala	Volcán de Fuego erupted in Guatemala, killing at least 190 people, the deadliest eruption in Guatemala since 1929.	
2019 Whakaari/White Island eruption	9 December 2019	New Zealand	Whakaari/White Island, an active stratovolcano off the east coast of New Zealand's North Island, erupted, killing 20 people.	

==== Droughts, heat waves, and wildfires ====
Event	Date	Country	Description	References
2011–17 California drought	December 2011 – March 2017	United States	The state of California suffered through a water drought for the most part of the decade, affecting the way how Californians showered, use their drinking water, and even some of their electricity.	
2015 Indian heat wave	24 May 2015	India	A heatwave in Southern India resulted in over 2,500 deaths.	
2015 Pakistani heat wave	20 June 2015	Pakistan	A related heatwave hit neighbouring Pakistan, killing over 2,000 people in Karachi alone.	
2016 Fort McMurray wildfire	1 May 2016	Canada	A wildfire began southwest of Fort McMurray, Alberta, Canada. On 3 May, it swept through the community, destroying more than 2,400 homes and buildings and forcing the largest wildfire evacuation in Alberta's history. The wildfire is the costliest disaster in Canadian history.	
2018 Camp Fire	8–25 November 2018	United States	A wildfire began in Northern California that eventually became the deadliest and most destructive wildfire in California history to date. It was also the deadliest wildfire in the United States since the Cloquet fire in 1918, and among the list of deadliest wildfires, it was the sixth-deadliest U.S. wildfire overall, killing 85 people and injuring 17.	
2019 Amazon rainforest wildfires	January 2019 – October 2019	Brazil Bolivia; Perù Paraguay	The 2019 wildfires season saw an unusual surge in the number of fires occurring in the Amazon rainforest and other parts of the Amazon biome contained within the countries of Brazil, Bolivia, Paraguay, and Peru during the 2019 Amazonian tropical dry season.	
2019–20 Australian bushfires	August 2019 – June 2020	Australia	The 2019 Australian bushfire season arrived in the wake of heavy droughts across the country, with fires covering the east coast including the metropolitan confines of Sydney. There were 34 direct fatalities and hundreds of properties destroyed. Subsequent smoke covered the city of Sydney and Melbourne, causing toxic air pollution.	

== Economics ==
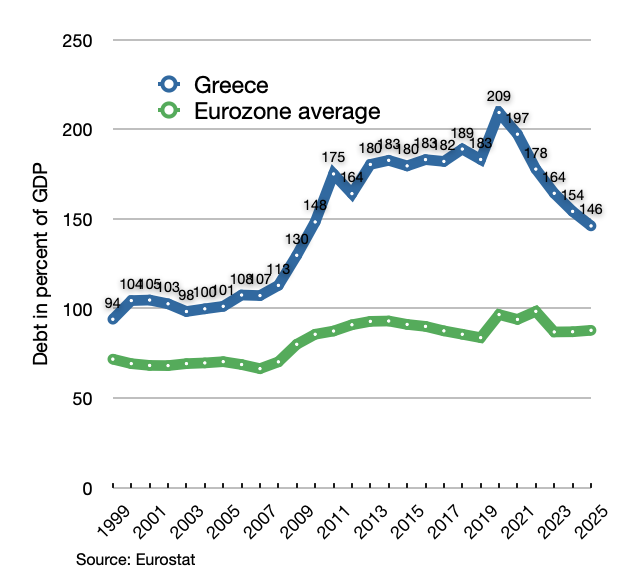
Greece and Eurozone's rise of debt in the early years of the decade

The weighted capital city residential property price index, produced by the Australian Bureau of Statistics, since 2003

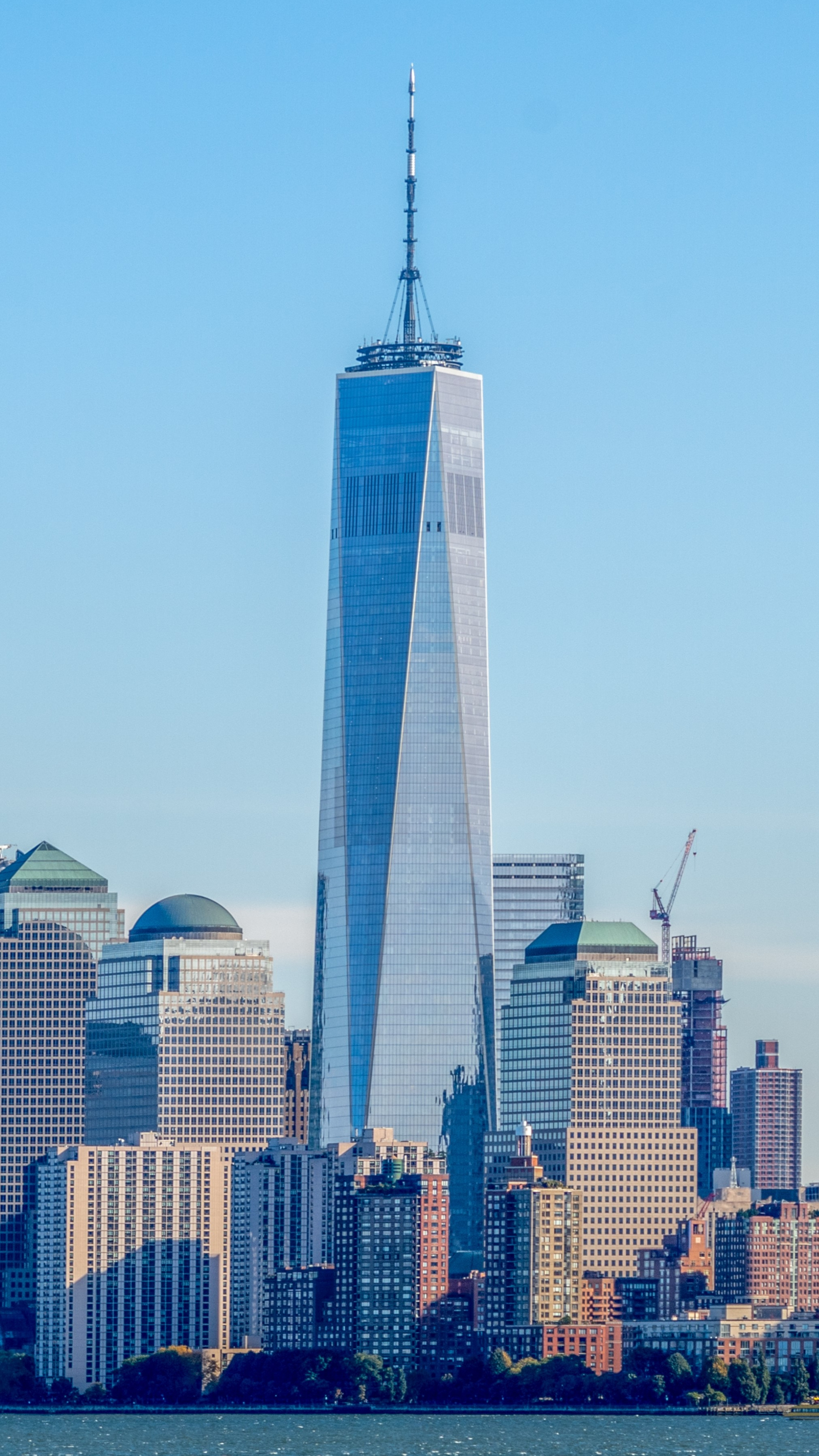
In 2014 the One World Trade Center opened its doors in the Financial District of Manhattan, serving as a replacement to the original World Trade Center Twin Towers that were destroyed in 2001. On the 10th anniversary of 9/11 in 2011 (the same year Osama bin Laden was killed), the 9/11 Memorial was opened.

The global economy during the 2010s was generally strong. It saw steady growth, low unemployment, and increasing consumer confidence recovering from the great recession. The decade ended with a strong finish, with 2019 seeing record highs in many areas. A sovereign-debt crisis in Europe began in early 2010, and the Greek government admitted that it was having difficulties servicing its large sovereign debt. In the summer and fall of 2011, bond yields for Italy and Spain spiked above 6 percent. By 2015 bond rates had returned to normal ranges across Europe, save for Greece, which accepted another, even more stringent bailout package. The size of the European Financial Stability Facility was increased from €440 billion to €2 trillion. Despite the Eurozone debt crisis, the American Dow Jones Industrial Average had its longest stretch of gains since the late 1990s tech boom. However, economic issues, including inflation and an increase in commodity prices, sparked unrest in many lower-income countries. In some countries, particularly those in the Arab world, political unrest evolved into socioeconomic crises, resulting in the Arab Spring leading to political instability and civil wars.

As a result of the global recession, many central banks instituted a zero interest-rate policy, or close to it. Another form of monetary stimulus was that of quantitative easing. The resulting flood of market liquidity caused a rise in asset prices. As a result, for example, United States stock prices reached record highs. Another consequence has been the rise in housing prices in many major world cities. Some of the cities which recorded the most dramatic rises included Sydney, San Francisco, Vancouver, and Auckland.

In 2010, China became the second largest global economy, surpassing Japan. Japan also saw a rating downgrade the following year due to debt burden. In August 2011, the S&P downgraded the United States' credit rating from triple AAA to AA-plus following a debt ceiling crisis. Also in 2011, a Gallup poll found that more than half of Americans believed the country was still in a recession. In June 2015, the Shanghai Stock Exchange lost a third of the value of A-shares within one month, an event known as the 2015–16 Chinese stock market turbulence. India became the fastest growing major economy of the world in 2015, surpassing China. In 2018, as the U.S. Federal Reserve raised interest rates, fears of a yield curve inversion preceding a potential U.S. recession sent inflation higher in several emerging markets, including Argentina, where interest rates hit 40% and an International Monetary Fund bail out was issued. In 2019, Singapore supplanted the United States as the world's most competitive economy, with the U.S. dropping to third, behind Hong Kong.

Global oil production in 2014 reached a historic peak, reaching 93 million barrels/day. In 2018, partially due to a shale boom, the United States overcame Russia and Saudi Arabia in becoming the world's largest crude oil producer, the first time since 1973. Around the year 2017 is a period seen by some economists as being the new peak of a "goldilocks economy". The International Monetary Fund's April 2019 World Economic Outlook stated, "After peaking at close to 4 percent in 2017, global [economic] growth remained strong, at 3.8 percent in the first half of 2018, but dropped to 3.2 percent in the second half of the year."

In 2018, United States President Donald Trump announced he would put into place new tariffs on some Chinese products, starting the 'US-China Trade War', an economic conflict involving the world's two largest economies. Trump said the reasoning for the trade war was to punish China for "unfair" trade practices, such as the appropriation of jobs and the theft of American intellectual property. China responded with tariffs of its own, and a cycle began, escalating the conflict. As part of his 'America First' policy, Trump also announced new tariffs were being placed on countries around the world for various products such as steel and aluminium, which also drew some economic retaliation from traditional U.S. trade partners.

By the end of the decade, in North American and some Western European domestic economies, consumer-level purchasing habits had shifted significantly, a partial consequence of the Great Recession's impact on discretionary incomes and a shifting breadwinner model. The so-called "retail apocalypse" had commenced as consumers increasingly resorted to online shopping and e-commerce, accelerating the decline of brick-and-mortar retail and the continued decline of indoor shopping malls. The transitioning retail industry and popularity of online shopping facilitated economic phenomena such as bricks and clicks business models, pop-up and non-store retailing, drone delivery services, ghost restaurants, and a quickly maturing online food ordering and delivery service sector. This was only further perpetuated by the rise in cryptocurrency throughout the decade, such as Bitcoin. By May 2018, over 1,800 cryptocurrency specifications existed.

In the same vein as cryptocurrency, the trend towards a cashless society continued as non-cash transactions and digital currency saw an increase in favourability in the 2010s. By 2016, only about 2 percent of the value transacted in Sweden was by cash, and only about 20 percent of retail transactions were in cash. Fewer than half of bank branches in the country conducted cash transactions. A report published in 2019 suggested that the percentage of payments conducted in cash in the United Kingdom had fallen to 34% from 63% from 2009. The 2016 United States User Consumer Survey Study claimed that 75 percent of respondents preferred a credit card or debit card as their payment method while only 11 percent of respondents preferred cash.

== Science and technology ==
Below are the most significant scientific developments of each year, based on the annual Breakthrough of the Year award of the American Association for the Advancement of Science journal Science.

- 2010: The first quantum machine
- 2011: HIV treatment as prevention (HPTN 052)
- 2012: Discovery of the Higgs boson
- 2013: Cancer immunotherapy
- 2014: Rosetta comet mission
- 2015: CRISPR genome-editing method
- 2016: The Laser Interferometer Gravitational-Wave Observatory makes the first observation of gravitational waves, fulfilling Einstein's prediction
- 2017: Cosmic convergence: Neutron star merger (GW170817)
- 2018: Development cell by cell
- 2019: First black hole image released

=== Technology ===
The late 2000s saw the rise of two prominent mobile operating systems, Android developed by Google and iOS developed by Apple. The widespread adoption of smartphones in the early 2010s, particularly following the success of Apple's iPhone and the proliferation of Android-powered devices from manufacturers such as Samsung and HTC, contributed to the rapid expansion of both platforms. By 2017, Android had become the leading mobile operating system globally, accounting for approximately 85.9% of the market share.

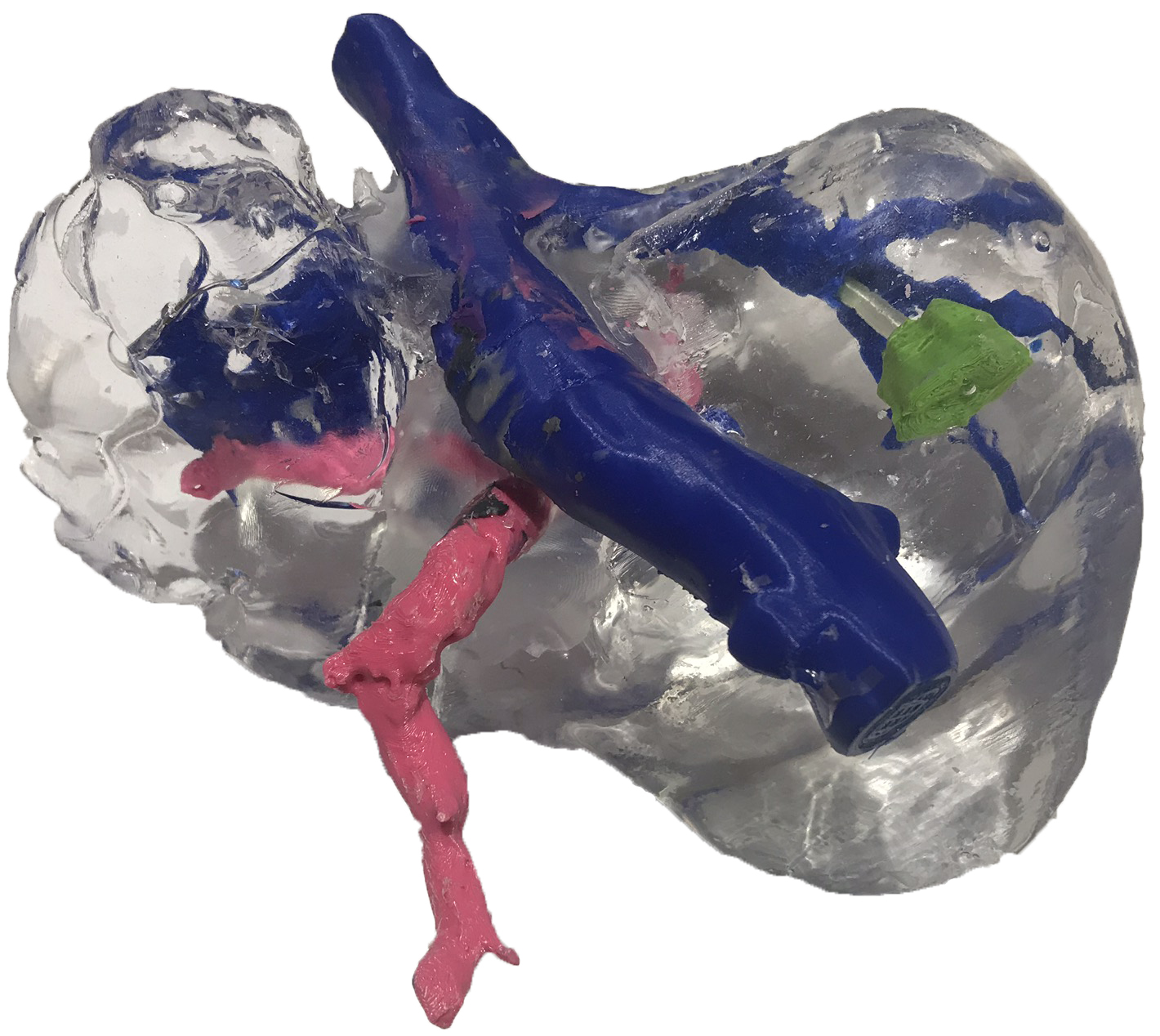
3D printed model of a human liver

Robotics, particularly drones like quadcopters, experienced a wide use and application in the 2010s. Autonomous and electric car technology and sales showed considerable growth as well. In addition, sustainable space launch technologies were spearheaded by entrepreneurs like Elon Musk.

In 2016, the number of people globally using mobile devices to access the internet overtook those using desktop computers for the first time, having been preceded by the U.S. two years prior in 2014. 3D printers also emerged in the 2010s and were referenced or used in pop culture during the decade.

In 2018, during the Falcon Heavy test flight, the first production car was launched into space. The car was attached to the Falcon Heavy rocket, the most powerful rocket in operation at the time, which side boosters successfully landed back on Earth after completing their portion of the mission.

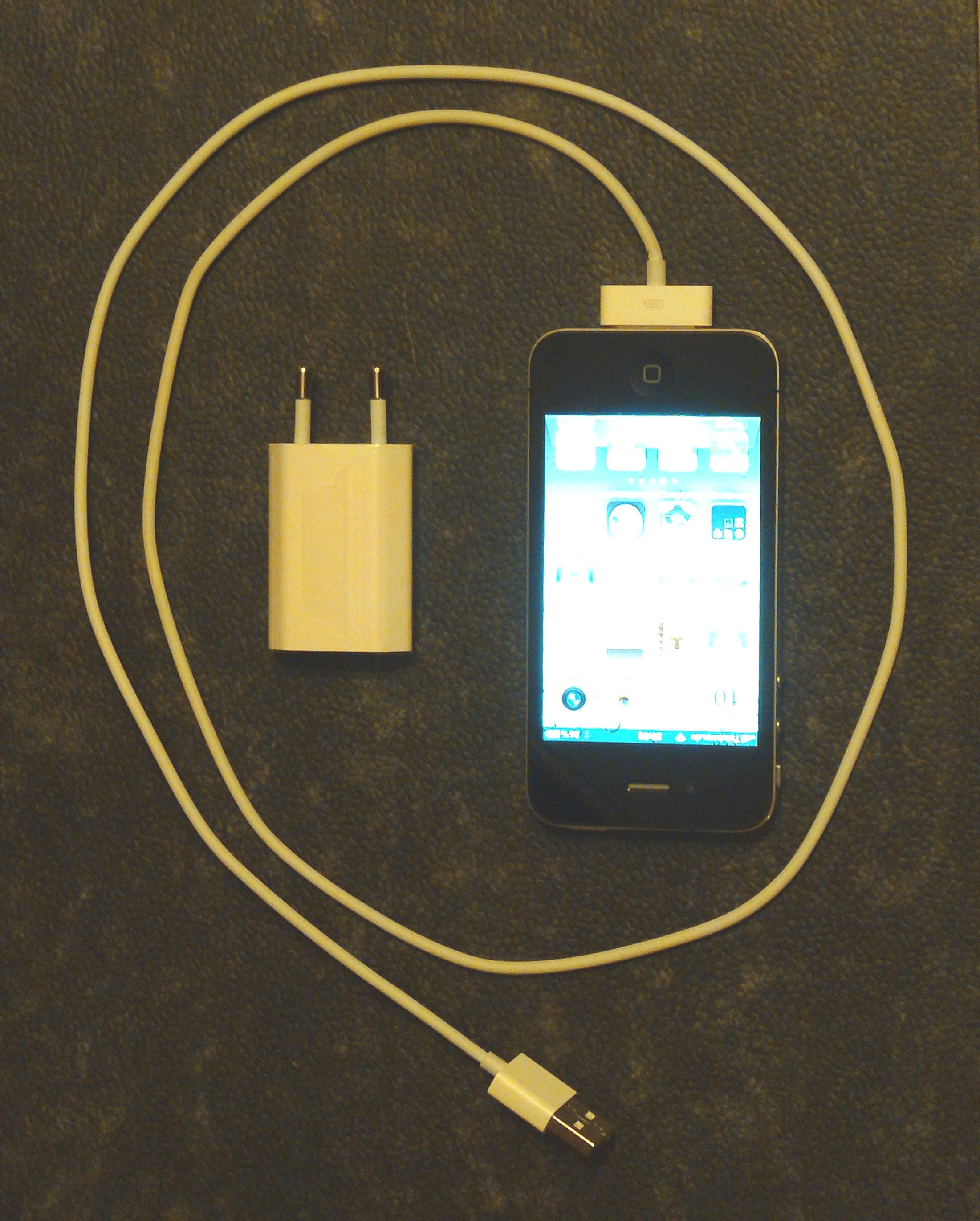
The 2010s saw the release of smaller and earlier iPhone iterations, as during the 2010s newer smartphones began to replace clamshell phones (flip phones). Phones of the 2010s mostly saw the usage of 3G and 4G technologies.

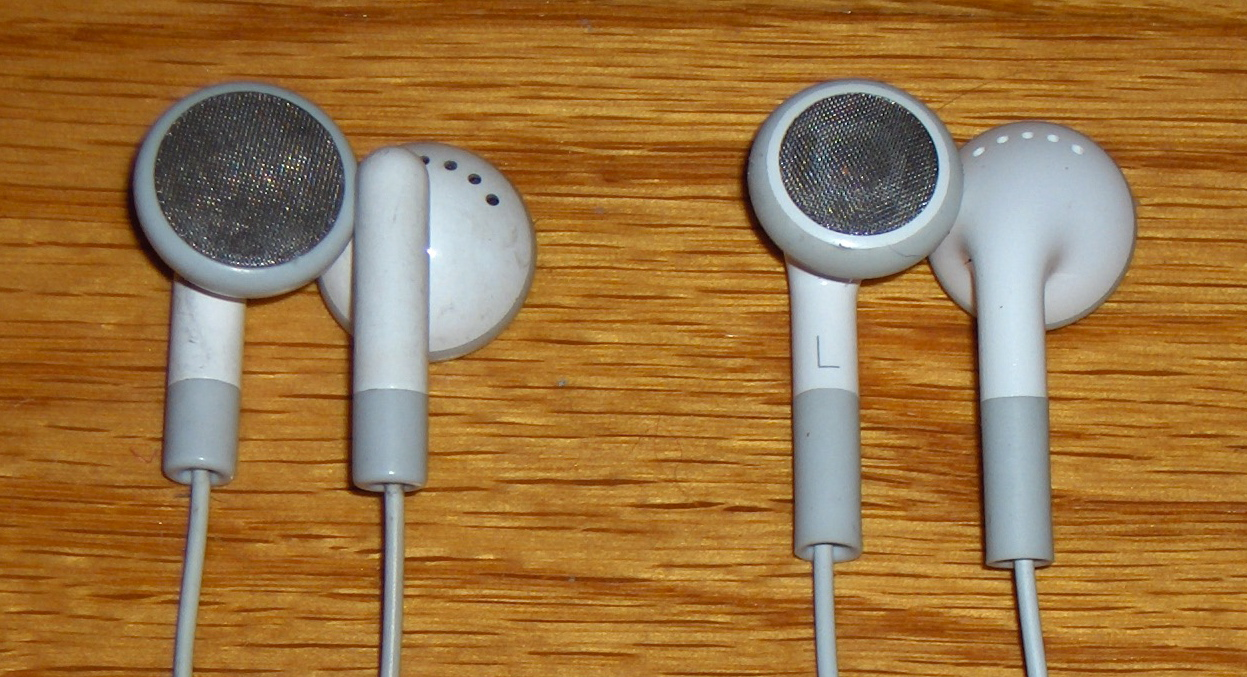
Many earlier iPhones would be released bundled with wired earbuds.

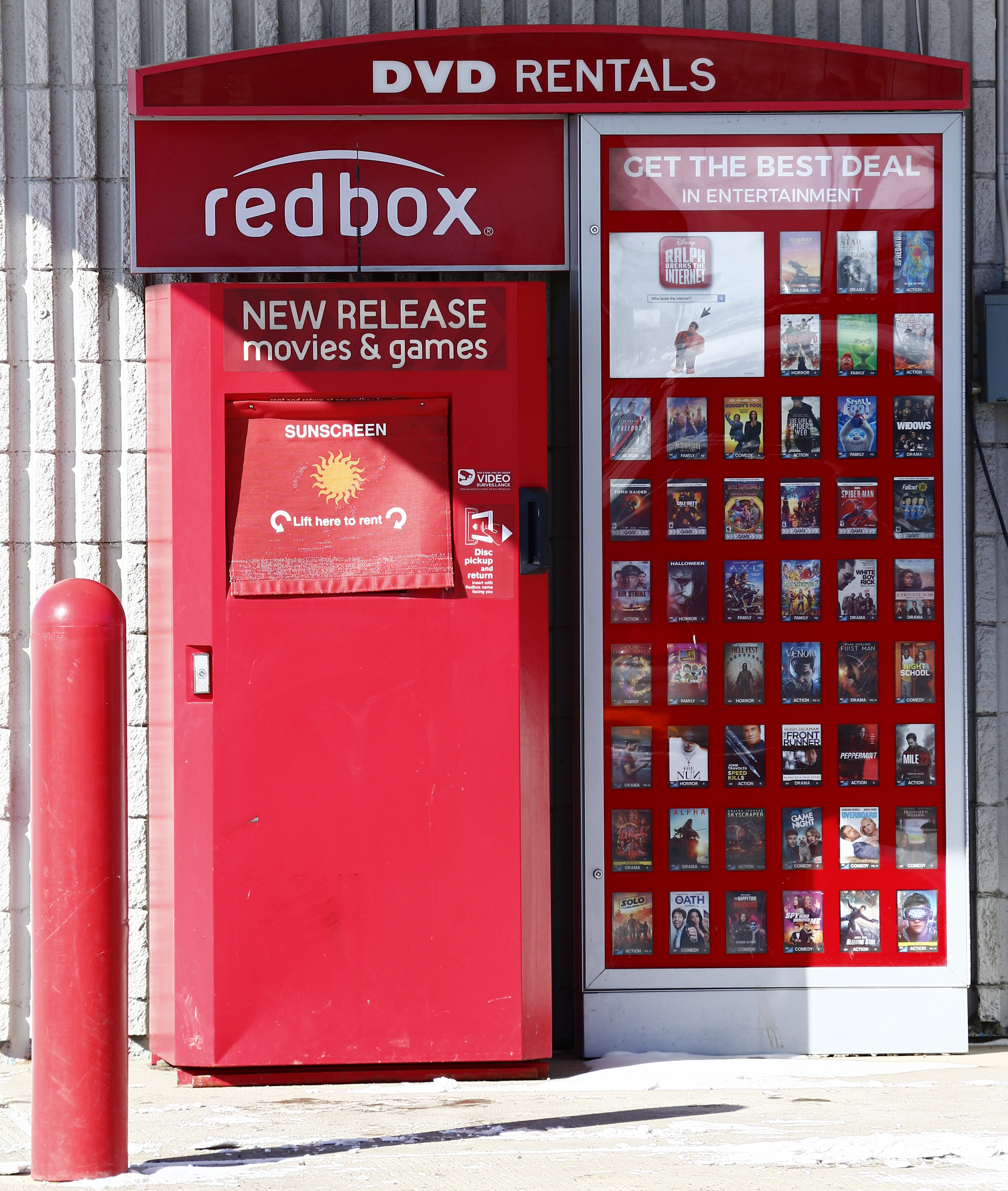
DVDs continued to be used throughout the 2010s decade, as new DVD rental pop-ups like Redbox appeared.

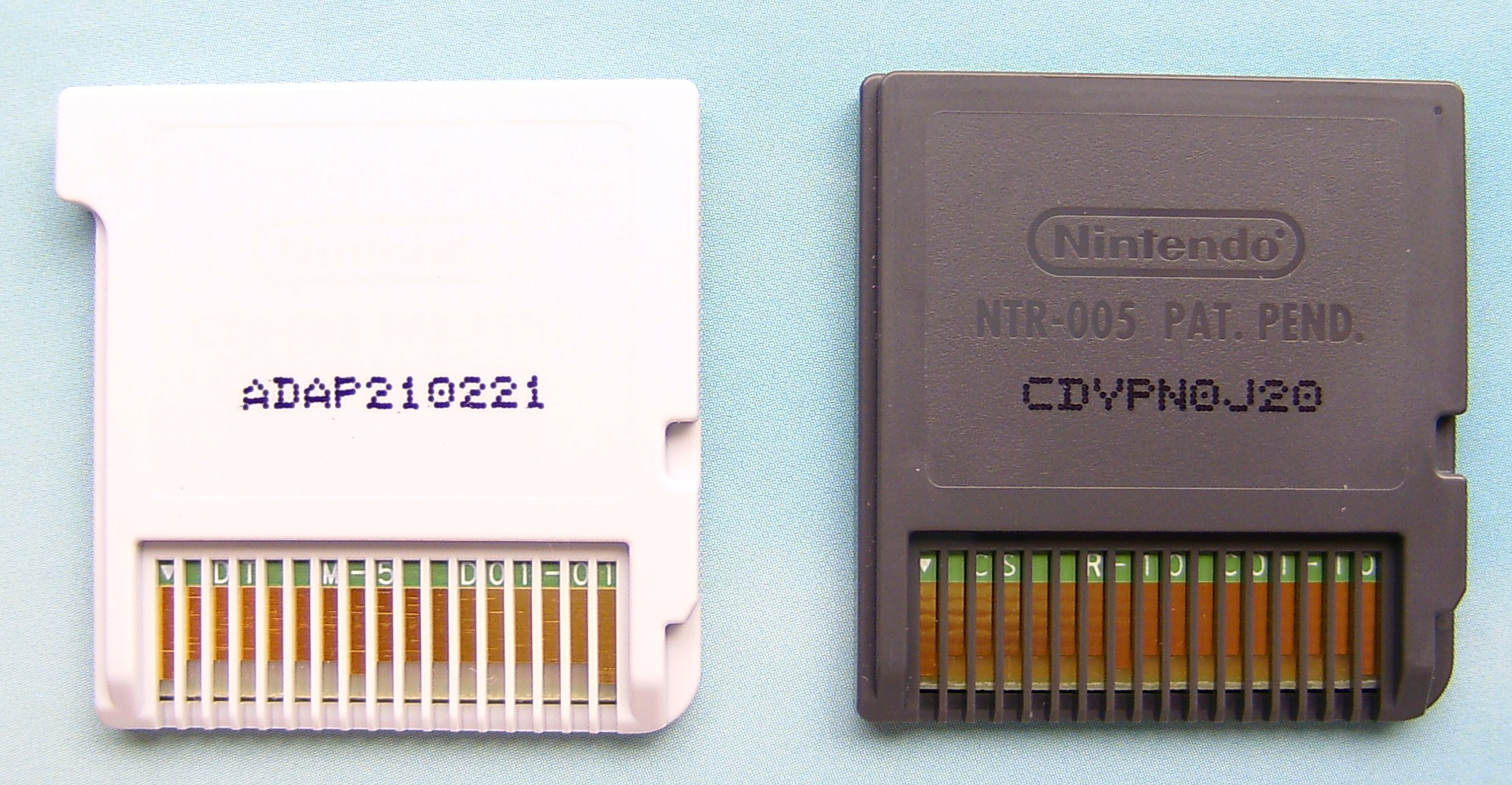
Nintendo DS and 3DS cartridges as would be used to play handheld video games earlier in the decade, before the later release of the hybrid Nintendo Switch system in 2017.

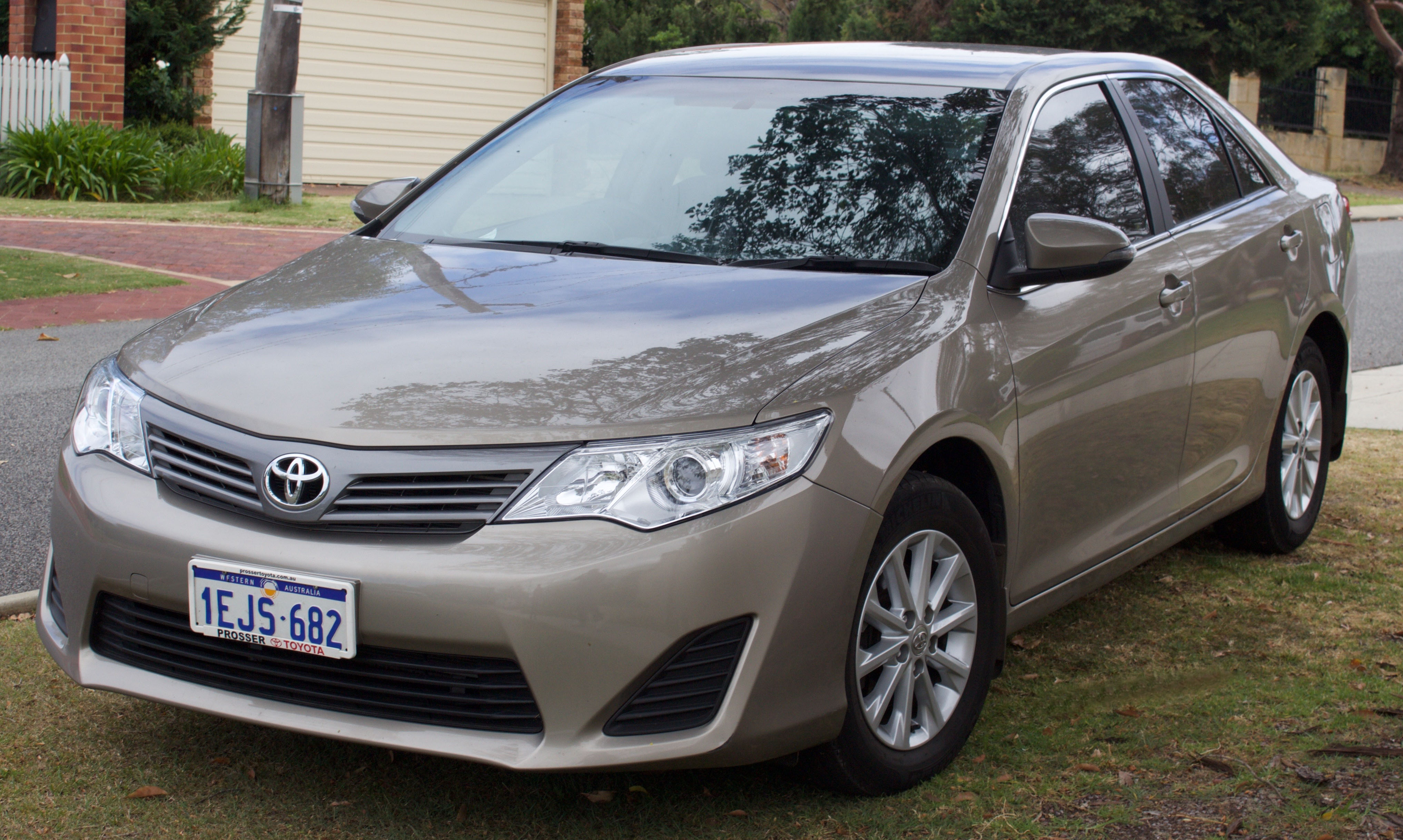
2013 Toyota Camry (ASV50R) Altise sedan. A typical mid-2010s car.

== Cyber security and hacking ==
Cyber security incidents, such as hacking, leaks or theft of sensitive information, gained increased attention of governments, corporations and individuals.

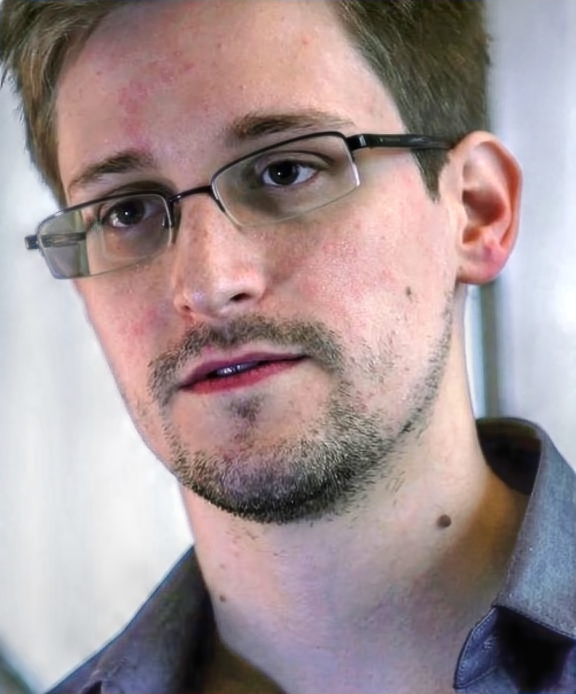
Edward Snowden, former NSA employee who revealed a large number of global surveillance programs.

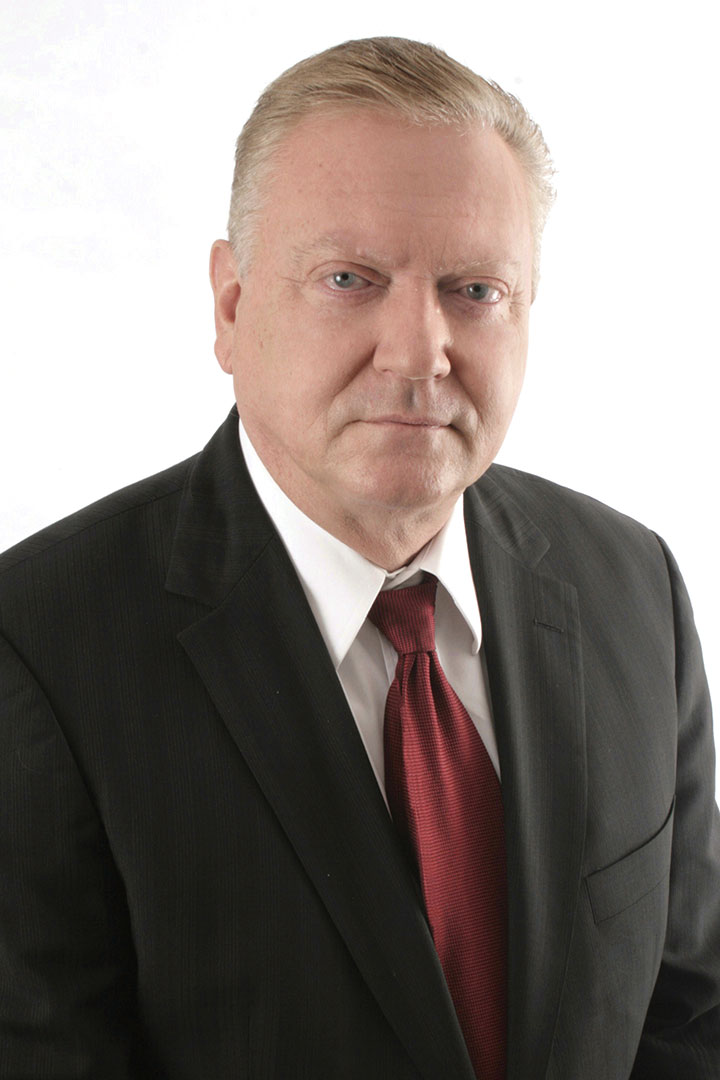
Jürgen Mossack, co-founder of Mossack Fonseca, which shut down in light of revelations from the Panama Papers.

Event	Date	Description
Afghan War documents leak	25 July 2010	WikiLeaks published more than 90,000 internal U.S. military logs of the War in Afghanistan. The documents revealed numerous cover-ups and absence of trials for captured or killed Taliban members by the coalition.
Stuxnet	August 2010	A malicious computer worm was responsible for causing substantial damage to Iran's nuclear program. Although neither country has admitted responsibility, the worm is now generally acknowledged to be a jointly built U.S.-Israeli cyberweapon.
Iraq War documents leak	22 October 2010	WikiLeaks disclosed nearly 392,000 U.S. Army field reports of the Iraq War, the largest leak in the history of the U.S. military. It documented multiple cases of misconduct, abuse of power against civilians and other war crimes by U.S. authorities in the country.
The Offshore leaks	April 2013	A report disclosed details of 130,000 offshore accounts, with some observers calling it one of the biggest hit against international tax fraud of all time. The report originated from the Washington D.C. investigative journalism nonprofit, the International Consortium of Investigative Journalists (ICIJ).
2010s global surveillance disclosures	5 June 2013	Edward Snowden leaked files through the Guardian newspaper detailing National Security Agency (NSA) privacy policies, including PRISM, the NSA call database, and Boundless Informant.
Office of Personnel Management data breach	5 June 2015	The Office of Personnel Management of the U.S. government announced that it was hacked, resulting in a massive data breach, stealing information of around 21.5 million people. The attack was suspected to have originated from China but it remains unclear if it was or not.
2016 Bangladesh Bank heist	4 February 2016	The Bangladesh Bank became a victim of theft after hackers attempted to steal US$951 Million from its account at the Federal Reserve Bank of New York. The hackers failed to steal the attempted amount but still got away with $81 million, which was diverted to the Philippines, making it one of the largest bank heists in history.
Panama Papers	3 April 2016	11.5 million confidential documents were leaked from the Panamanian law firm Mossack Fonseca that detailed financial and attorney–client information of more than 214,488 offshore companies. The leaks revealed information of various prominent figures being involved in hidden financial dealings within tax havens and companies doing business with terrorist organisations and governments under international sanctions.
Yahoo! data breach	22 September 2016	Yahoo Inc. reported that account information for up to 500 million users in 2014 had been hacked, compromising personal data from the accounts, including names, addresses, passwords, telephone numbers and possibly encrypting other information.
October 2016 Dyn cyberattack	21 October 2016	A currently unknown attacker launches multiple distributed denial-of-service (DDos) attacks on networks operated by DNS provider Dyn, making numerous sites difficult or impossible to access for a period of time, including Twitter, Reddit, Netflix, Spotify, The New York Times, BBC News, and PayPal. The Department of Homeland Security opens an investigation.
WannaCry ransomware attack	12 May 2017	A large cyberattack infected more than 230,000 computers in 150 countries, demanding ransom payments in the cryptocurrency bitcoin in 28 languages. The attack spread by multiple methods, including phishing emails and on unpatched systems as a computer worm. The attack was described by Europol as unprecedented in scale, affecting large companies such as Telefónica and parts of Britain's National Health Service.
Paradise Papers	5 November 2017	A set of 13.4 million confidential electronic documents relating to offshore investments. The documents originate from the offshore law firm Appleby, the corporate services providers Estera and Asiaciti Trust, and business registries in 19 tax jurisdictions. At 1.4 terabytes in size, this is second only to the Panama Papers, it is the second biggest data leak in history.

== Health and society ==
AIDS, a pandemic responsible for killing over 30 million people since its discovery in the early 1980s, especially in sub-Saharan Africa, became a treatable condition, though by the end of the decade only two cases had been cured. With good treatment patients can generally expect normal lives and lifespans. However, as of 2011 only some 5 million of the 12 million affected people had access to such treatment.

During the 2010s, social changes included increases in life expectancy and falling birth rates leading to larger proportions of the population being elderly. This put pressure on pensions and other social security programs in developed nations. The environment became a topic of greater public concern around the world. Many parts of the world moved towards greater acceptance of LGBT people often including the legalisation of same-sex marriage. The internet took an ever greater role in entertainment, communication, politics and commerce, especially for younger people and those living in wealthier countries. In 2011, the world population reached seven billion people.

== Popular culture ==
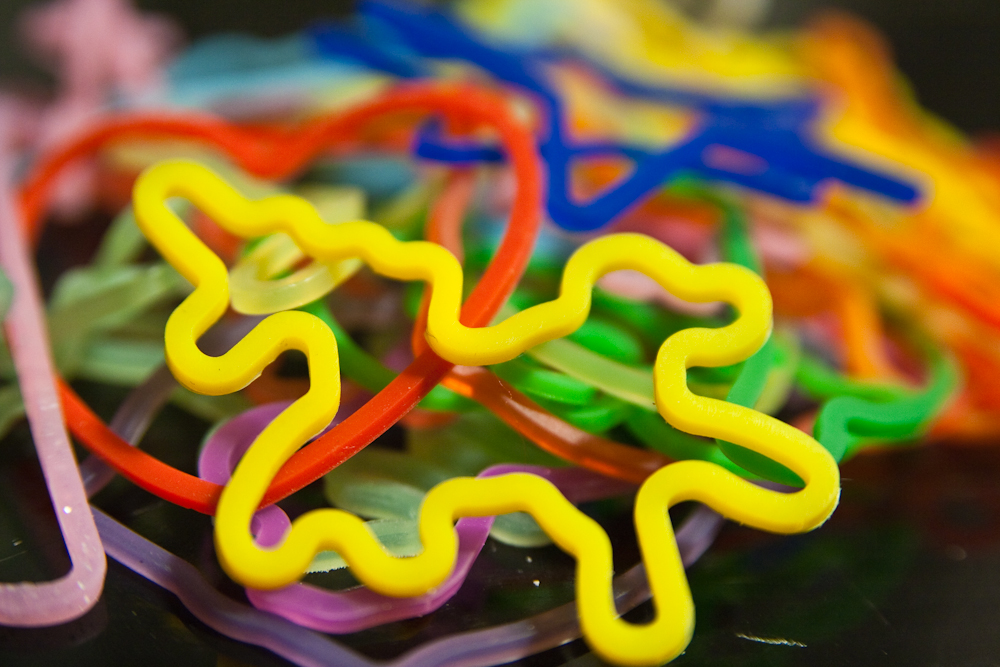
Silly Bandz, a piece of pop culture and fashion wear in the early 2010s. They were often traded and worn by school children.

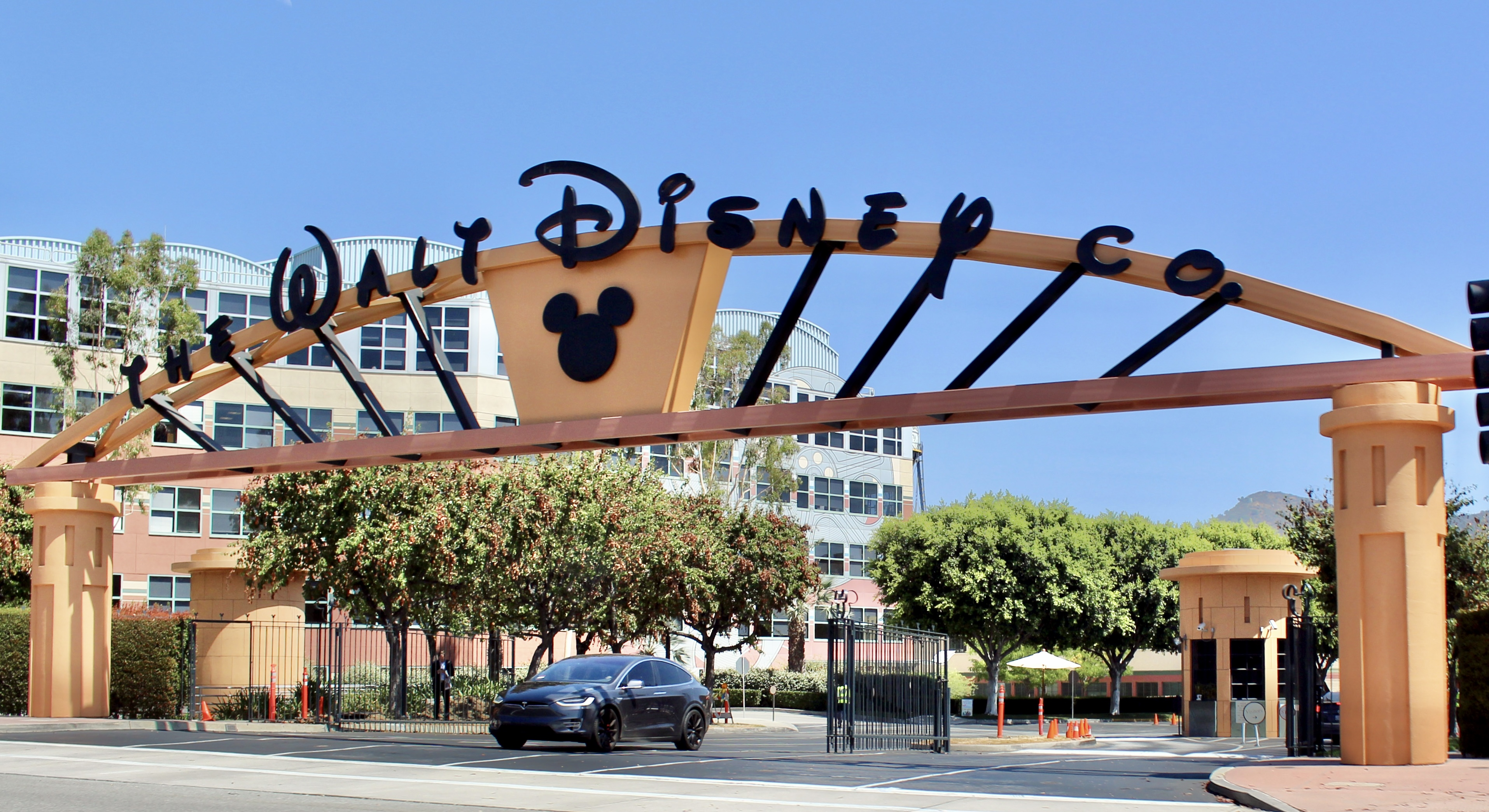
Disney, Pixar, and Illumination led CGI films during the decade, making some of the highest-grossing movies of all time like Toy Story 3, Monsters University, Frozen, Zootopia, Incredibles 2, Despicable Me, and The Secret Life of Pets. Other studios released CGI films like Madagascar 3: Europe's Most Wanted, Ice Age: Continental Drift, The Lego Movie, and Spider-Man: Into the Spider-Verse.

The Big Bang Theory, which was popular in the 2010s, became the top sitcom throughout its airing on CBS. The show featured numerous pop-culture figures from science and tech, including Bill Gates, Buzz Aldrin, and Elon Musk.

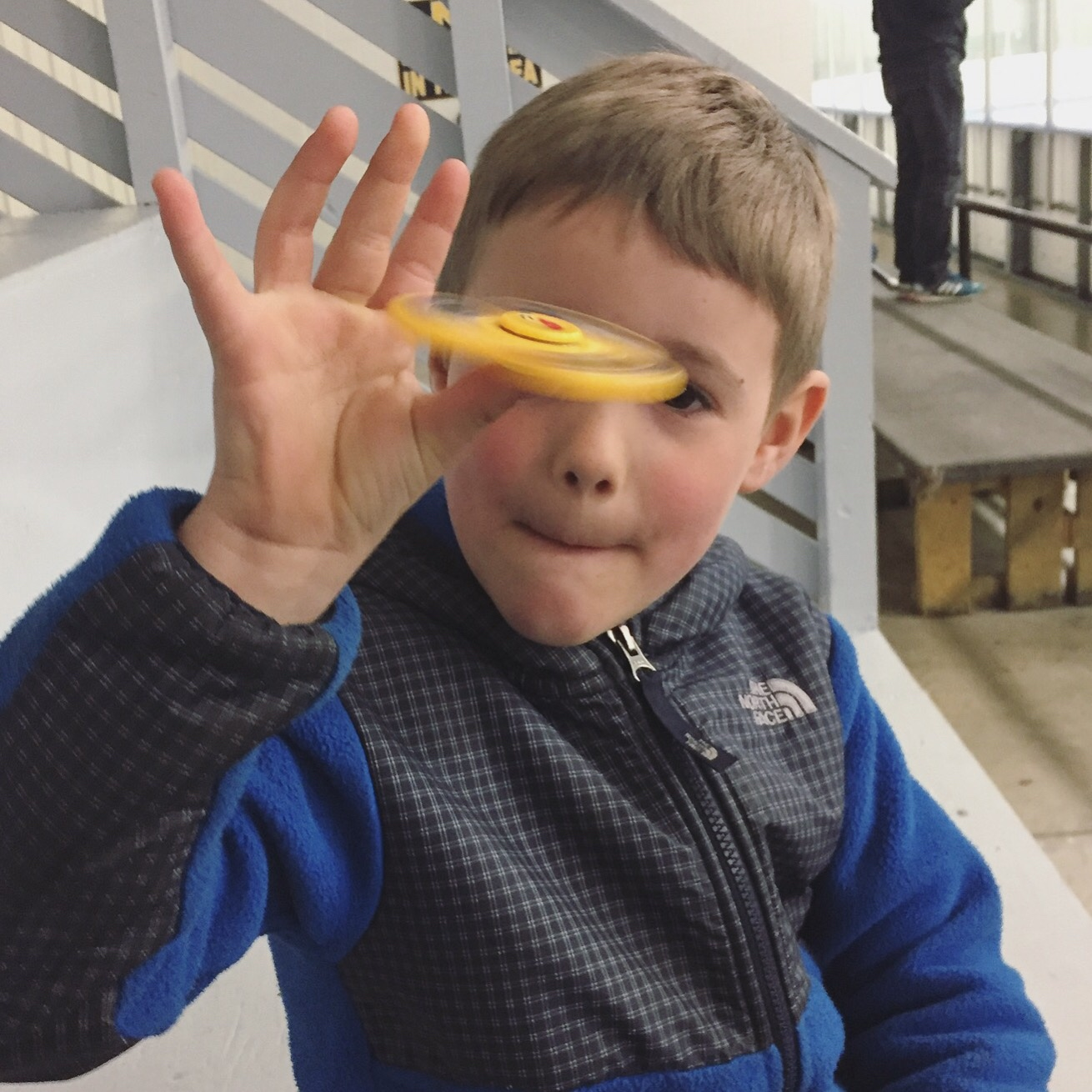
A young child spinning a fidget spinner, one of the most popular toys of the decade from spring and summer of 2017, joining novelty toys of the 2010s such as the fidget cube.

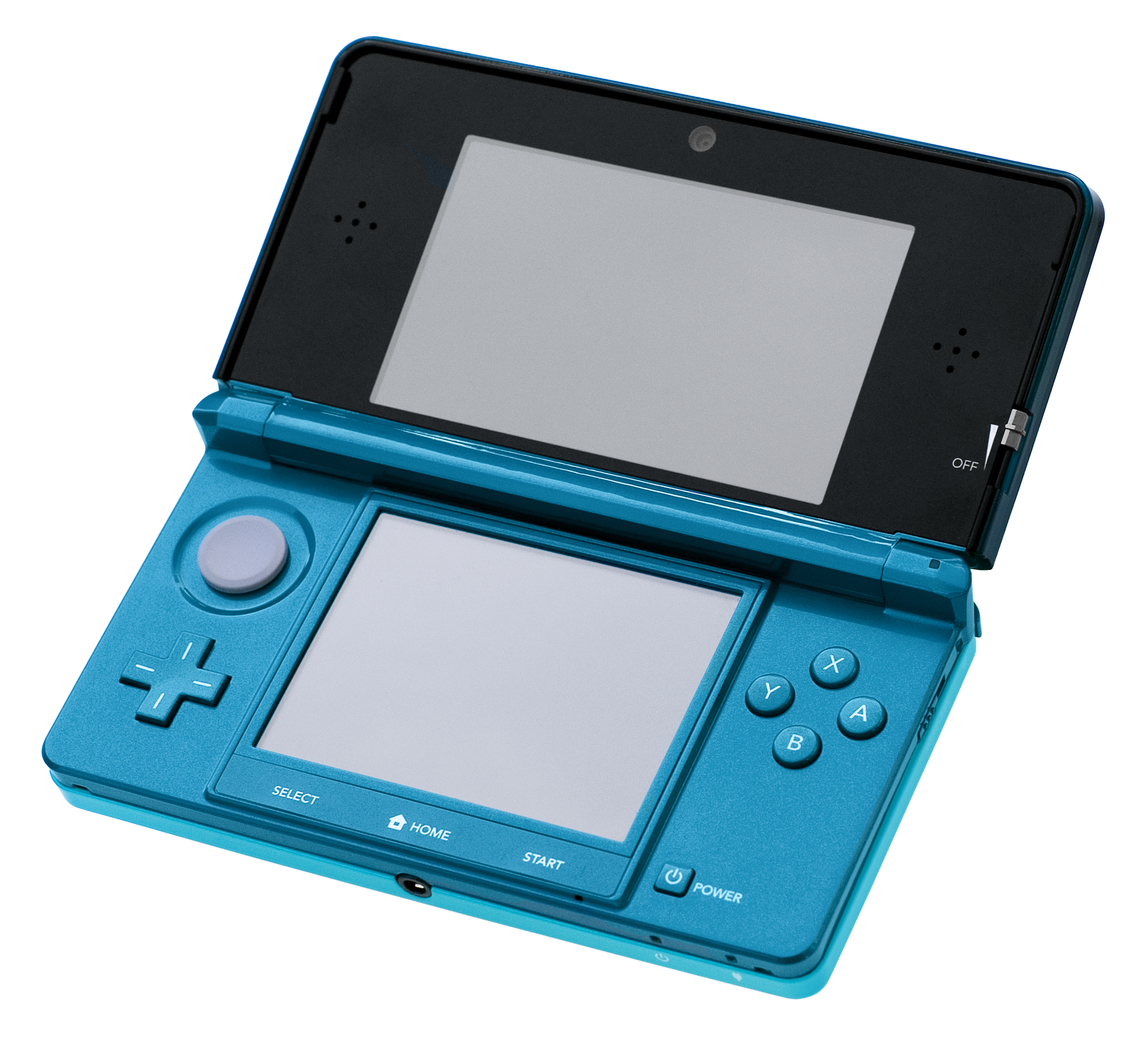
The Nintendo 3DS, a portable 3D gaming device that contained glasses-free 3D and was released during the height of the 3D fad in the 2010s. Its flagship title was Super Mario 3D Land.

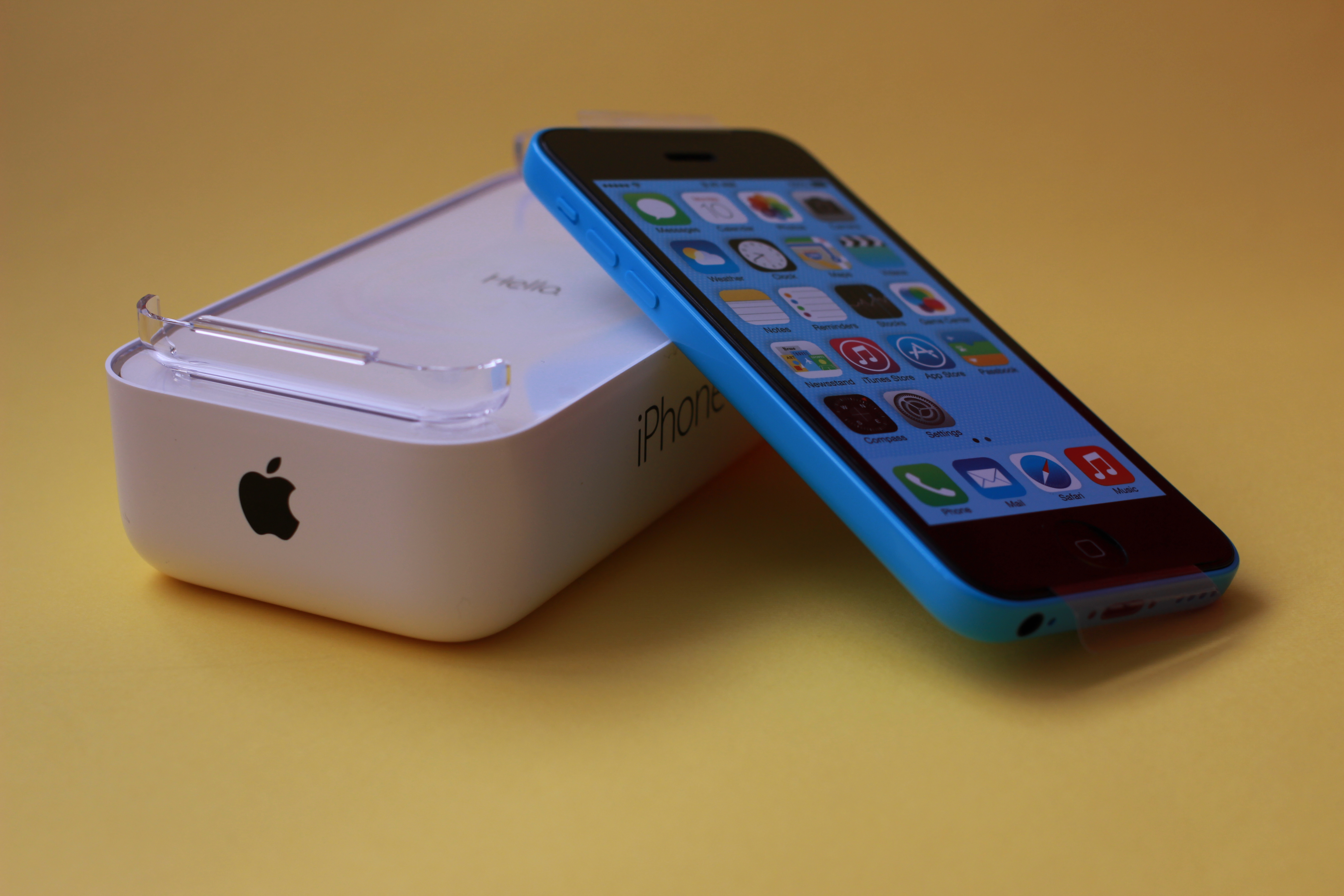
Smartphones and tablets started to replace flip-phones and become mainstream. They could be used to play games, make telephone calls, download music, and check the Internet. The iPad was first introduced in 2010 by Steve Jobs, who later died in 2011.

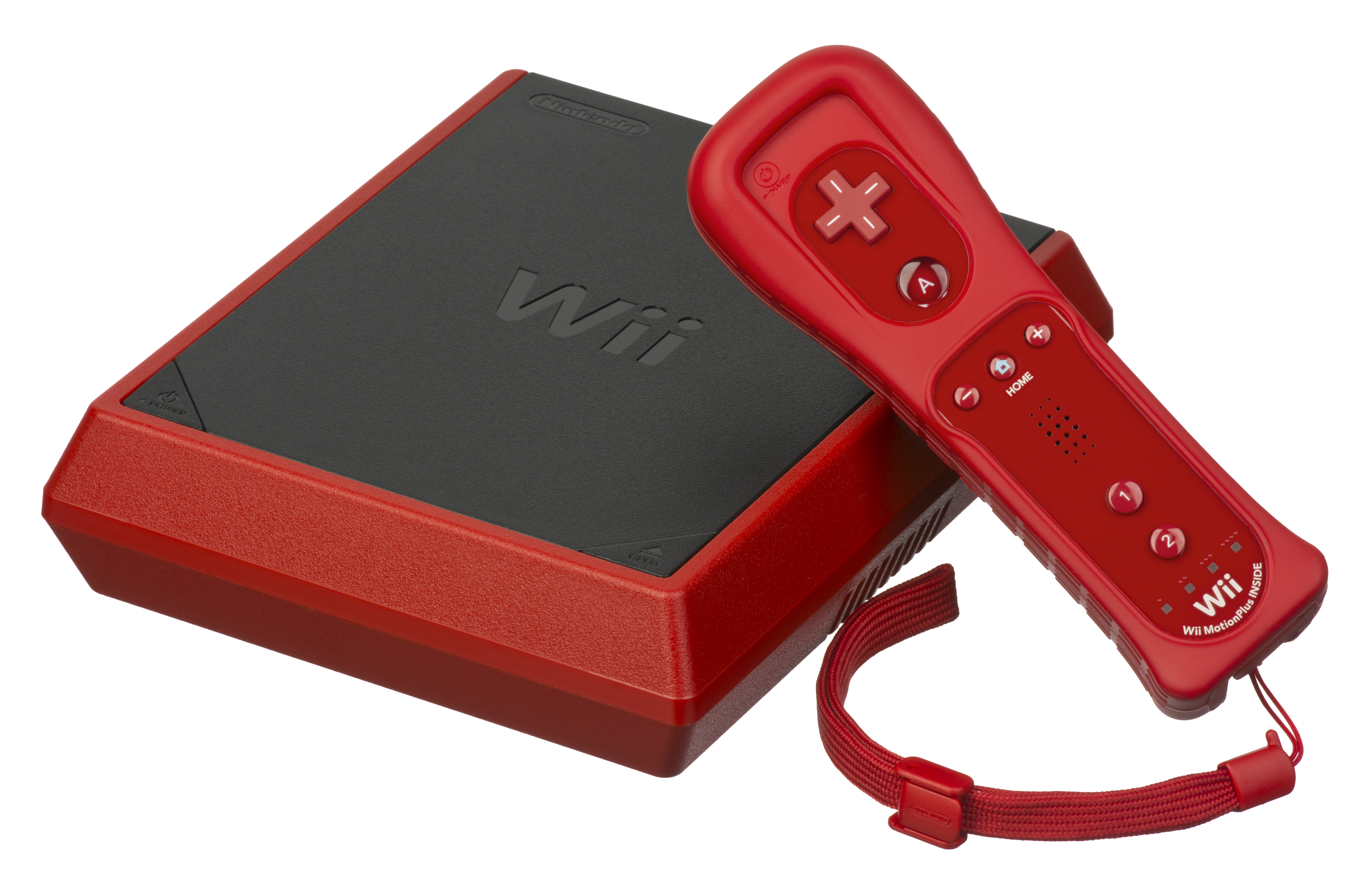
The Wii (Wii Mini c. 2013 pictured) was a popular gaming console in the 2010s which influenced the Microsoft Kinect and PlayStation Move. One of the most critically acclaimed games of the decade, Super Mario Galaxy 2, released on the Wii.

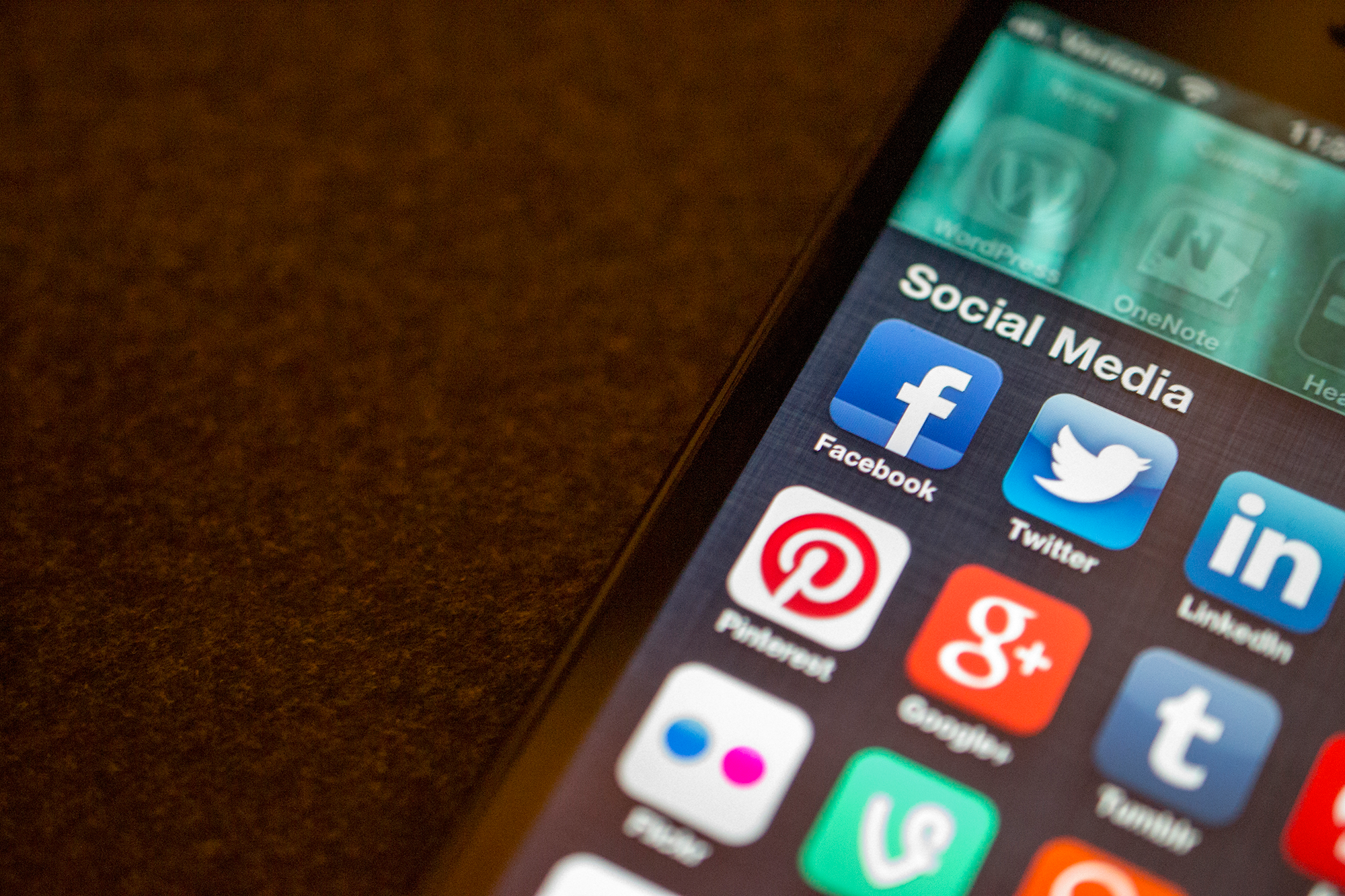
A cultural shift was that social media heavily took over. For really the first time in history, US presidents like Barack Obama and Donald Trump could communicate directly to citizens via applications like Facebook, Twitter and Instagram.

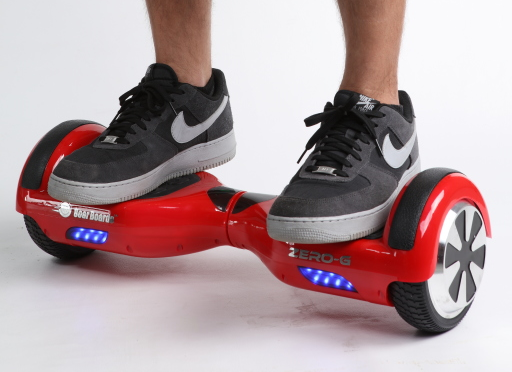
A self-balancing scooter. These devices (also named hoverboards at the time) attracted much attention and curiosity around 2015 on the Internet from appearing on shows such as Jimmy Fallon and Conan.

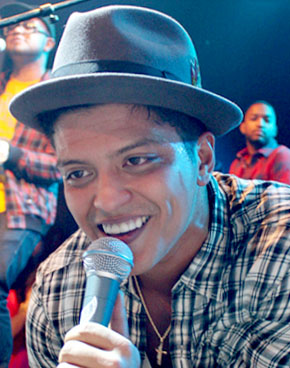
Fedora hats were popular at the beginning of the 2010s, worn here by Bruno Mars in 2011, singer of "Uptown Funk" (the Billboard Hot 100's #1 song of the 2010s).

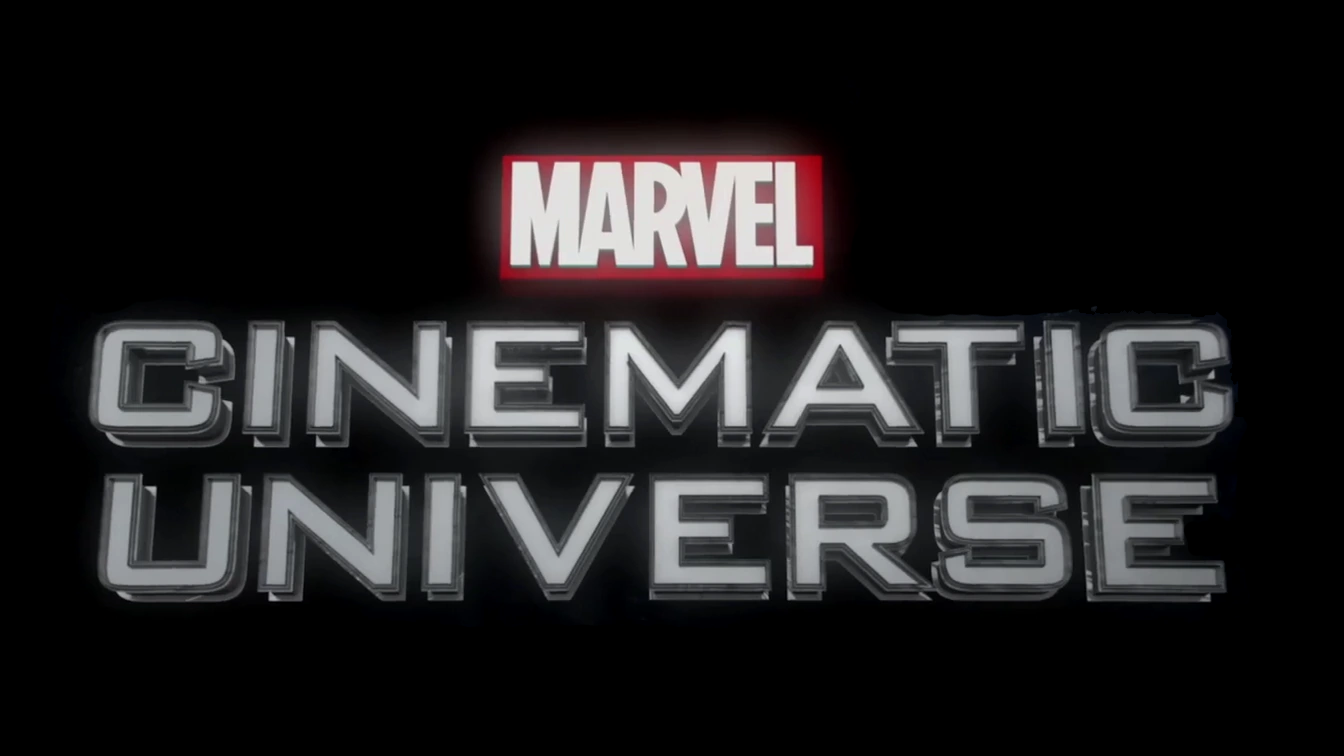
The Marvel Cinematic Universe, which started in 2008, achieved popularity in the 2010s and became one of the highest-grossing franchises in film history.

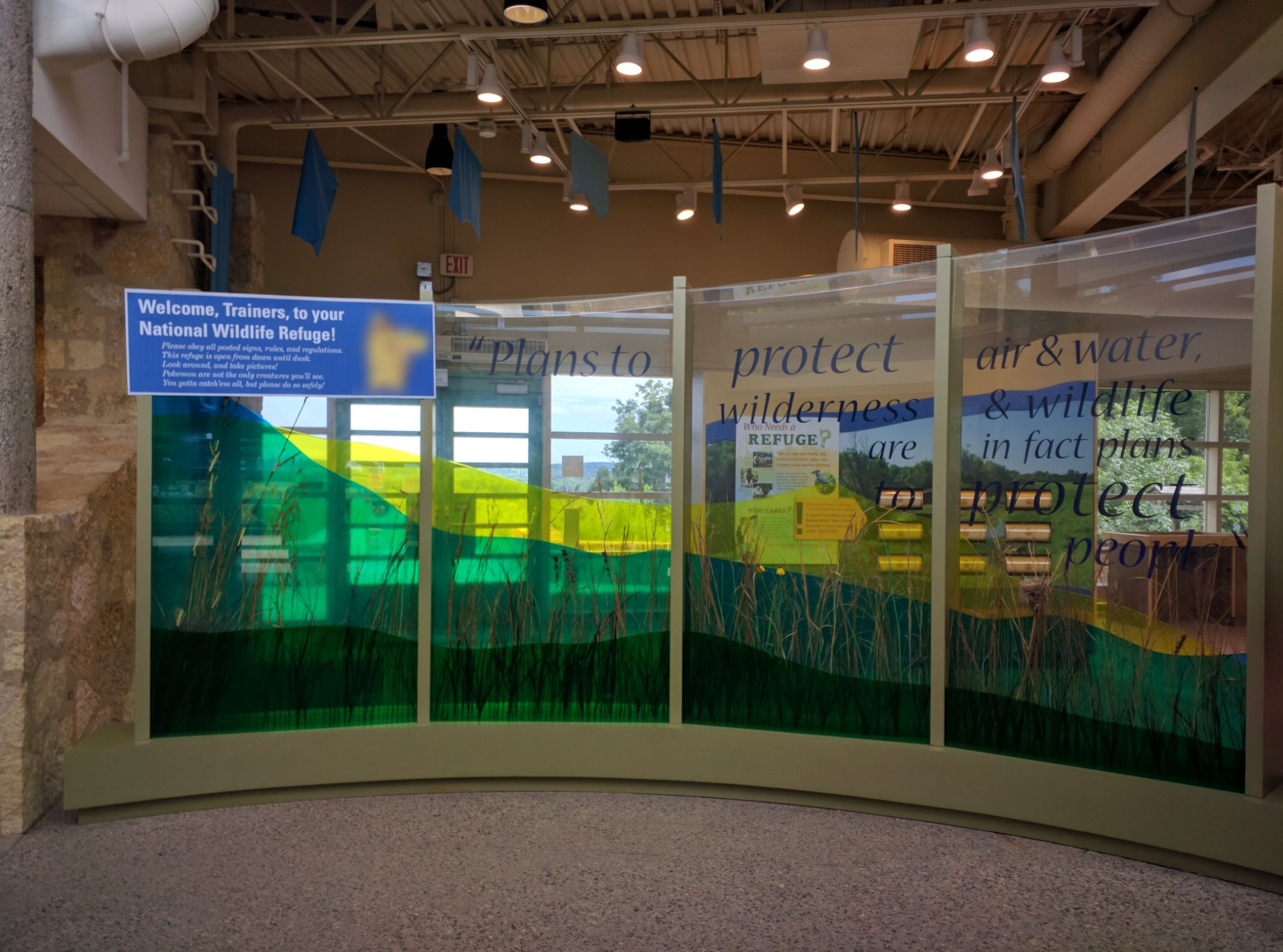
A public stop or "Pokéstop" for the game Pokémon Go. The game made use of AR, or augmented reality, and became huge in the summer of 2016.

Two men using cell phones placed inside VR headsets in 2018. The same year Steven Spielberg's Ready Player One released, which featured Vive Virtual Reality headsets and helped advance motion capture.

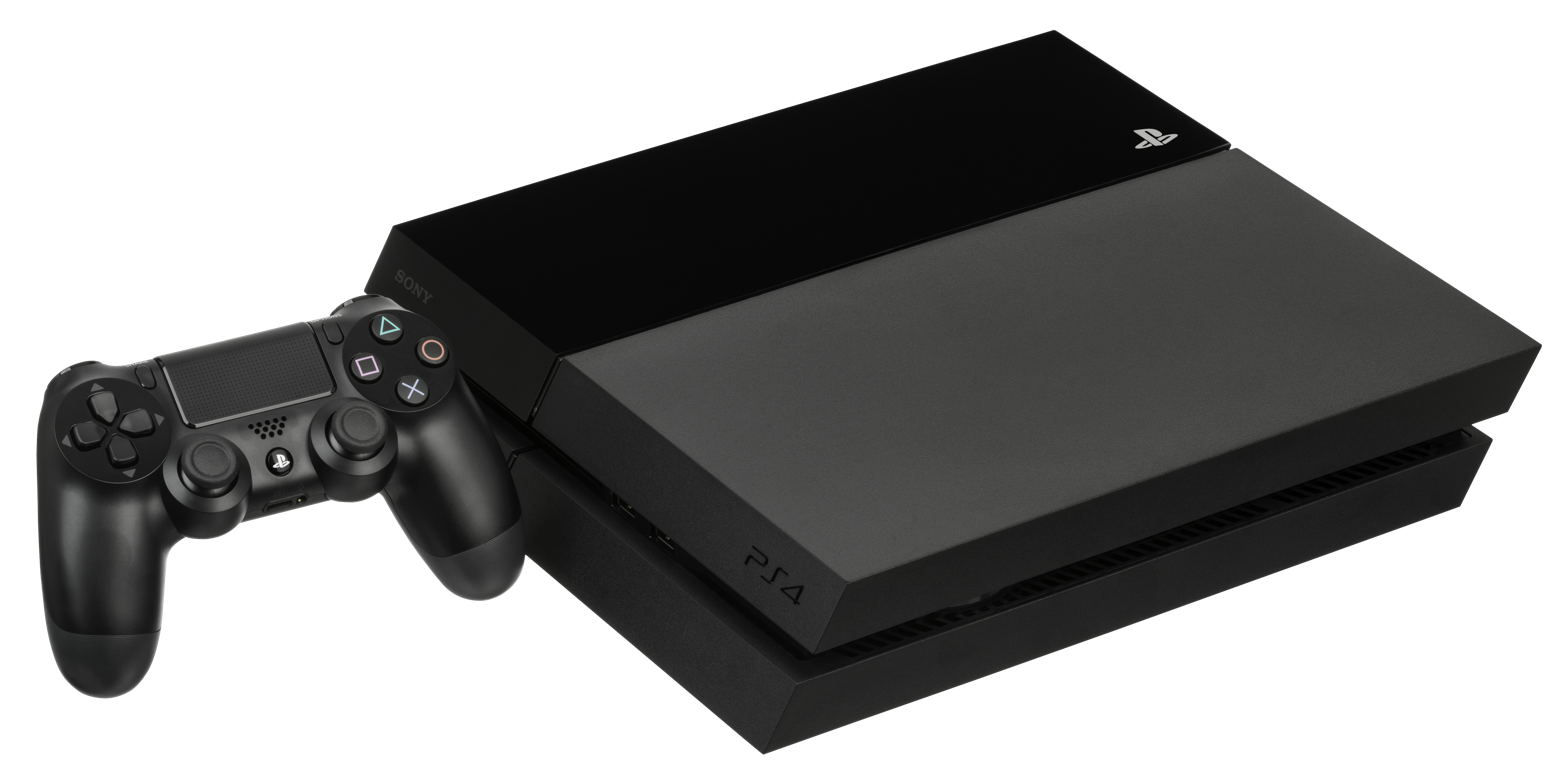
The eighth generation of video game consoles like PlayStation 4 (pictured), Xbox One, and Nintendo Switch were released in 2013 and 2017. These systems popularized games like The Last of Us, Super Smash Bros. Ultimate, The Legend of Zelda: Breath of the Wild, Mario Kart 8, Super Mario Odyssey, Minecraft, and Grand Theft Auto V.

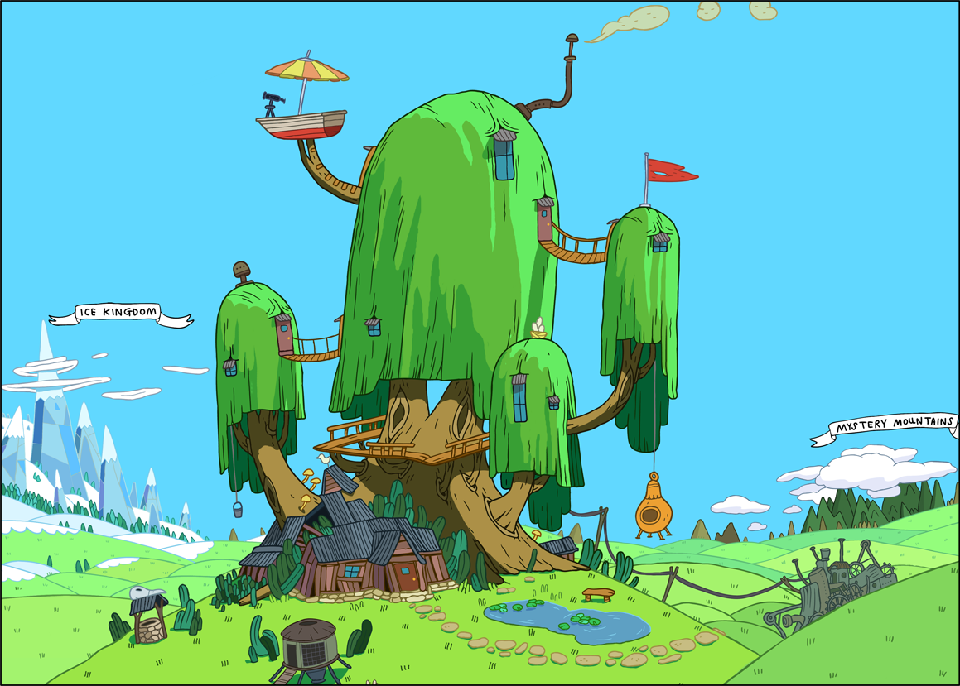
Adventure Time and other cartoons like Regular Show, Gravity Falls, Rick and Morty, Archer, Bob's Burgers, Steven Universe, The Amazing World of Gumball, Over the Garden Wall, Big Mouth, BoJack Horseman, and My Little Pony: Friendship Is Magic were popular in the 2010s.

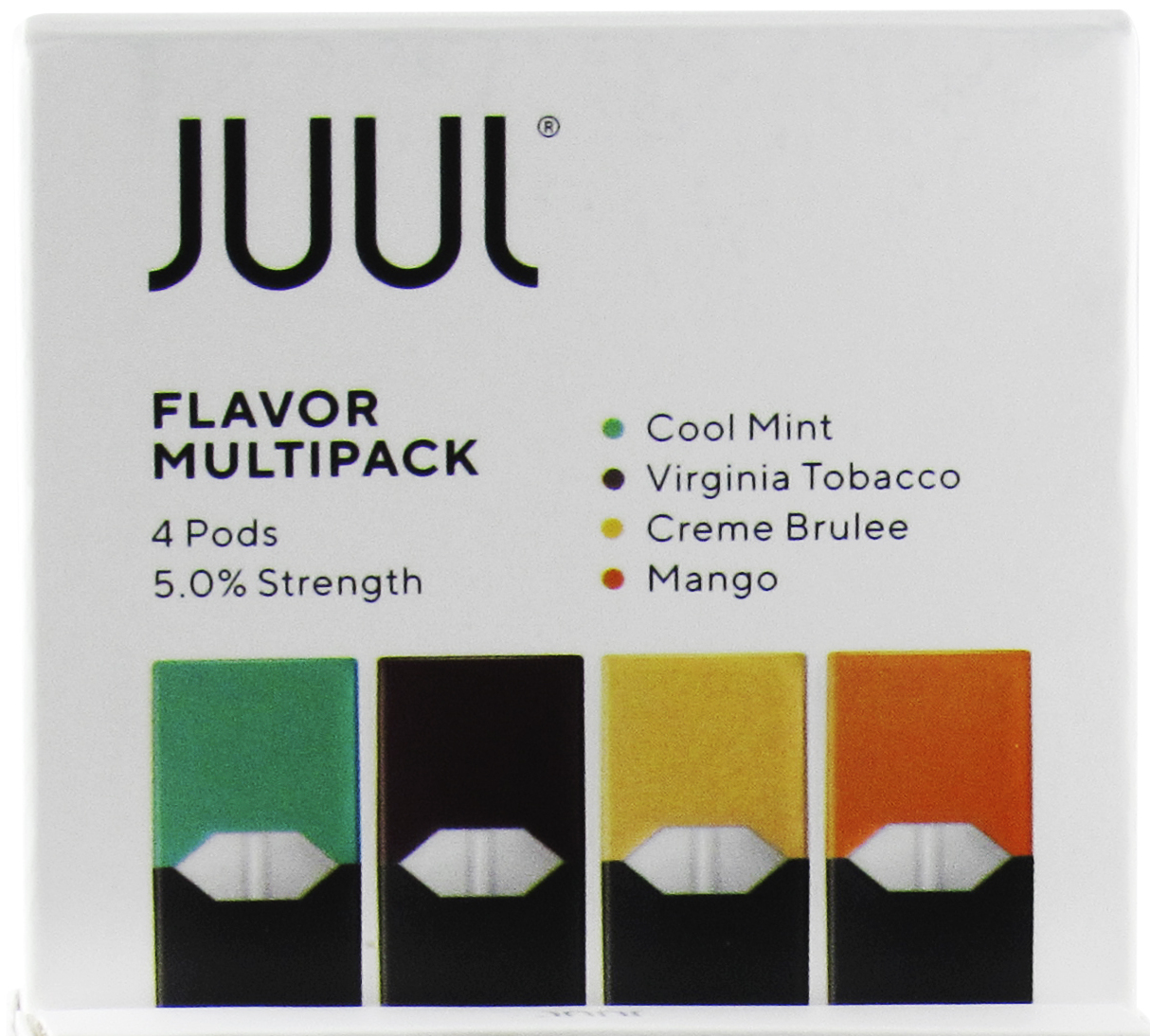
In the late 2010s, vaping became popular. Fruit-flavored vape cartridges could be purchased as well, and became highly controversial.

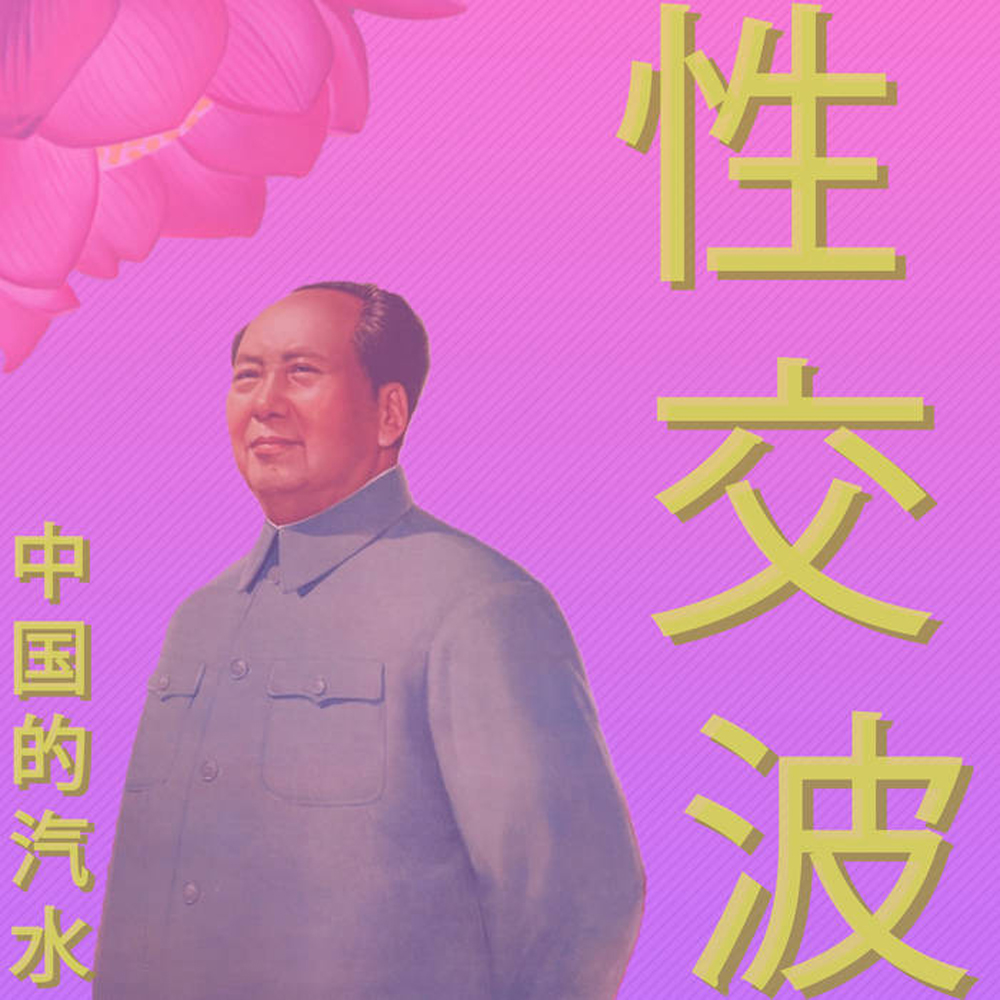
Vaporwave was a 2010s music genre that attracted attention. Lofi hip-hop was also new and grew a following. Floral Shoppe and Lofi Girl helped define these genres of the 2010s.

Synthwave was another music genre that achieved mainstream popularity during the 2010s, having been used in numerous popular films, TV shows and video games of the decade. It was inspired by the music and aesthetics of the 1980s.

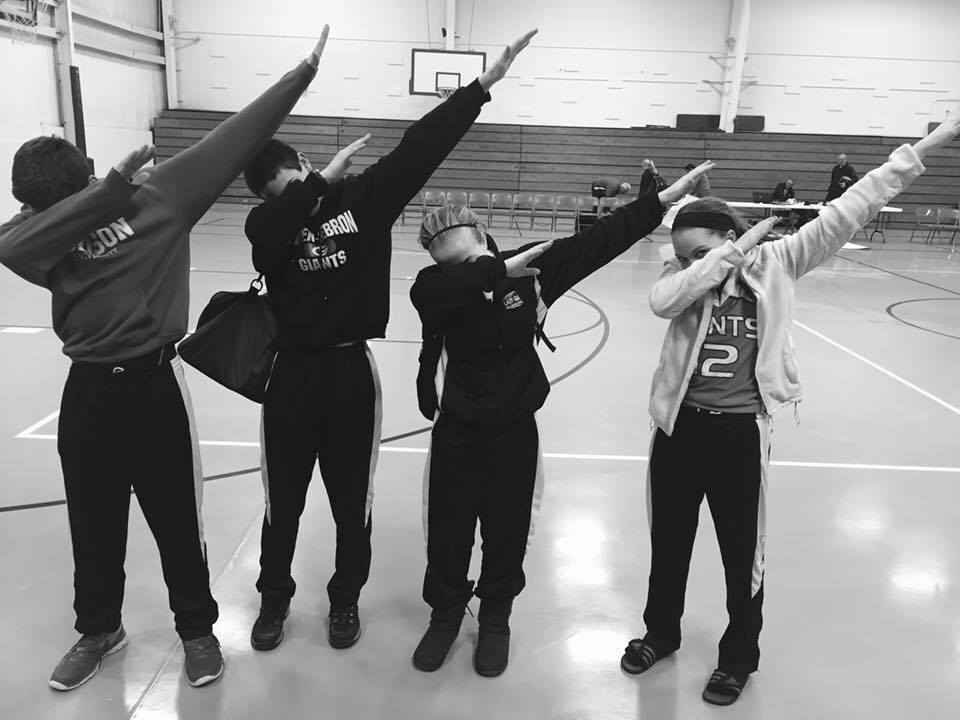
A group of teens dabbing, a popular fad and gesture of the youth around 2015–2016. Dabbing was the most prominent dance trend of the 2010s, which joined such dances as Flossing and the Harlem Shake.

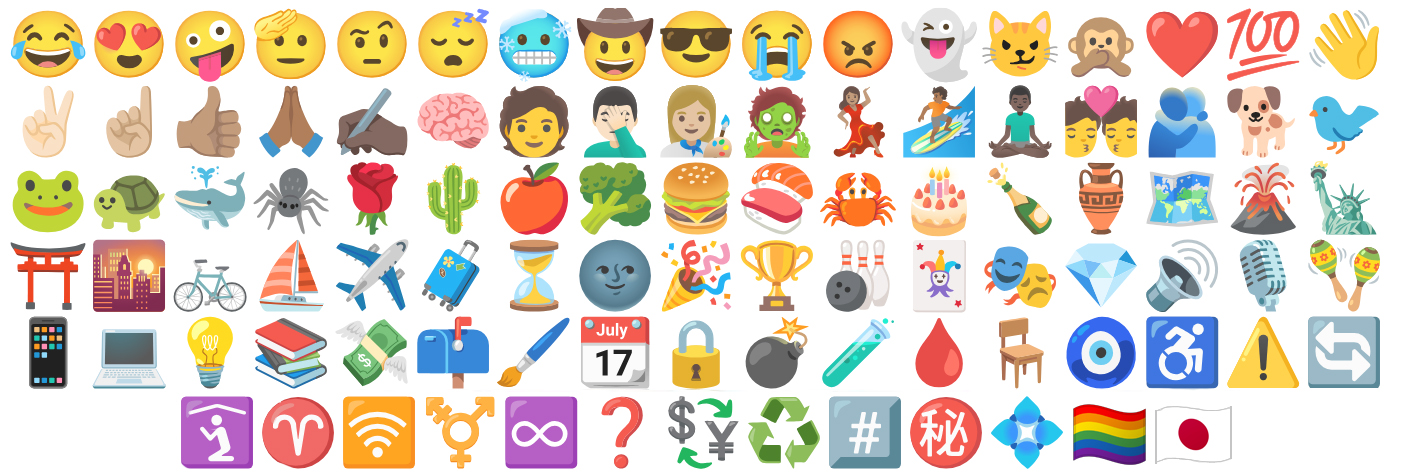
A group of emojis. The 2010s saw the first usage of modern emoticons or "emojis" which were often on the operating systems of phones and computers.

In the 2010s, indie artists gained much wider traction online. A few popular indie artists of the decade included talents such as Mitski (pictured), Gotye, Mac DeMarco, Tame Impala, and Foster the People.

Five Olympic Games were held in the 2010s: Vancouver in 2010, London in 2012, Sochi in 2014, Rio de Janeiro in 2016 and Pyeongchang in 2018.

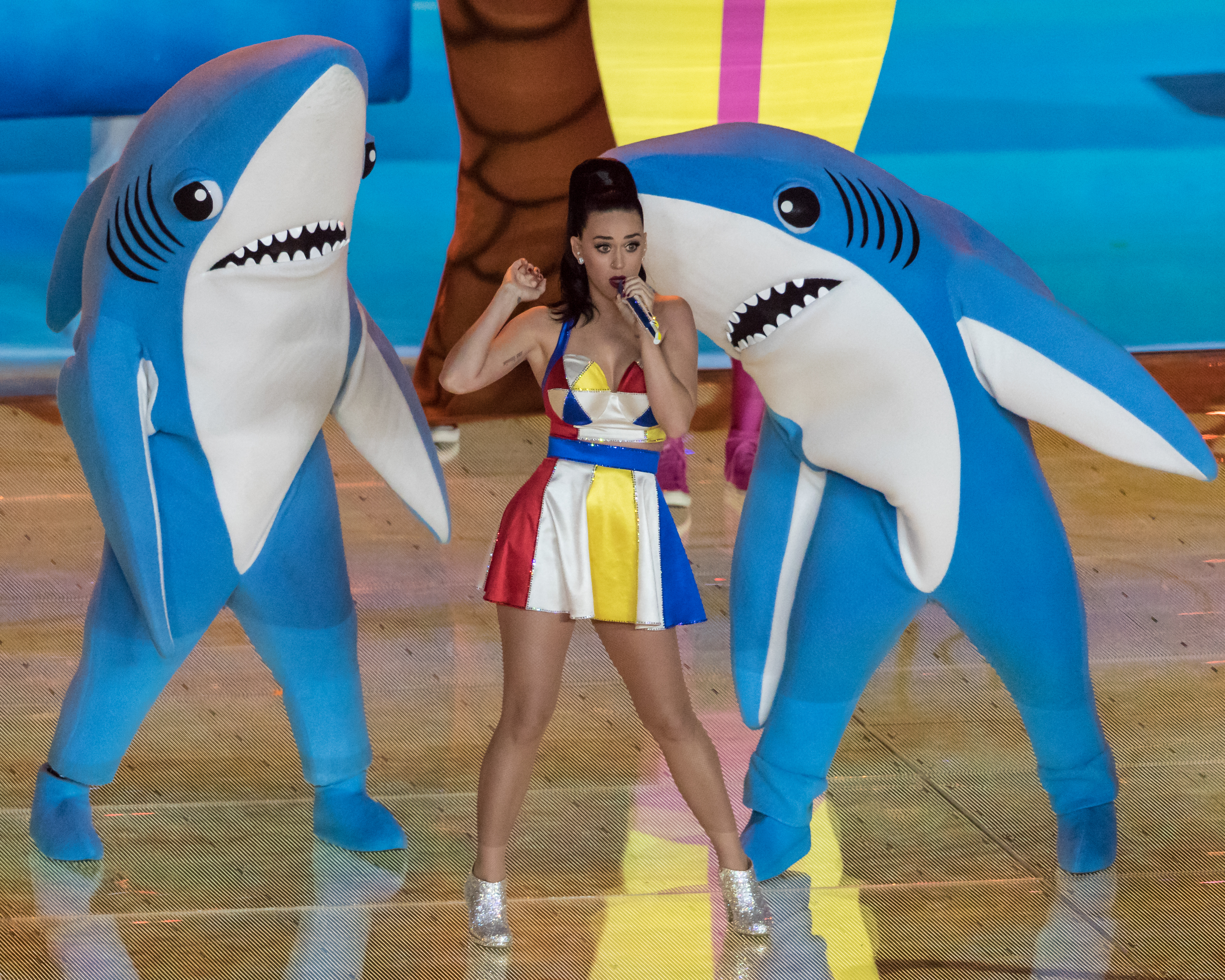
Dance-pop is one of the musical genres that was dominant during the 2010s. It's performed by songsters such as Katy Perry.

=== Fashion ===
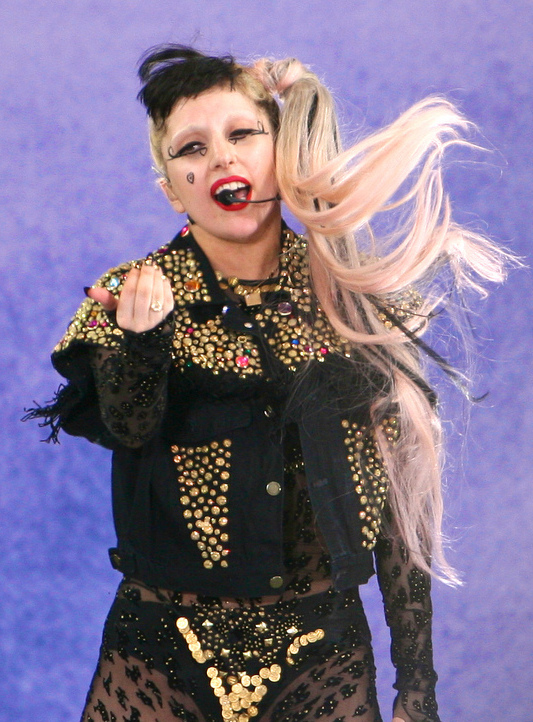
Lady Gaga was a fashion icon of the era

Fashion of the 2010s became slimmer-fit and slightly more formal compared to previous decades. In addition, people's handheld devices such as cellphones (and their colorful cases), selfie sticks (for a brief period during the middle of the decade), tech-like Beats headphones, smart watches, wired and by the end of the decade wireless ear buds, as well as handheld gaming systems became more prevalent personal items.

The decade was also defined by new hipster fashion (hipster styles were marked by the wearing of knit beanies, checkered shirts, and clothes from thrift stores; as well as hobbies like horticulture, photography, and specialty coffee) athleisure, and a revival of austerity-era and other nostalgic alternative fashion trends (such as 1980s-style neon streetwear in the first part of the decade, and unisex 1990s-style elements influenced by grunge).

In 2018, a subculture of "e-kids" came into existence, whom took their style from Japanese street fashion, cosplay, skater aesthetic, and other pieces of pop culture. In contrast to the colorful subculture of "e-kids" later in the decade, the early 2010s saw the Emo revival.

In the United States, political fashion became a genre of fashion starting around 2016, as people wore hats like MAGA hats (popularized by President Donald Trump), as well as the Pussyhat which was created by feminists in opposition to Trump's sexist comments. These two pieces of fashion wear would be popularized in the 2010s in popular culture on television and further, but would become controversial in their own right.

The decade sparked many smaller fashion movements, notable examples including Cottagecore and Normcore (a notable icon of Normcore in the 2010s was Steve Jobs, whom represented the decade's casual clothing). Fad toys and accessories like the Fidget spinner, Silly Bandz, and Shutter shades each had waves of popularity among youth throughout the decade. Funko Pops were a collectible fad during the decade and remained popular in the 2020s.

=== Internet ===
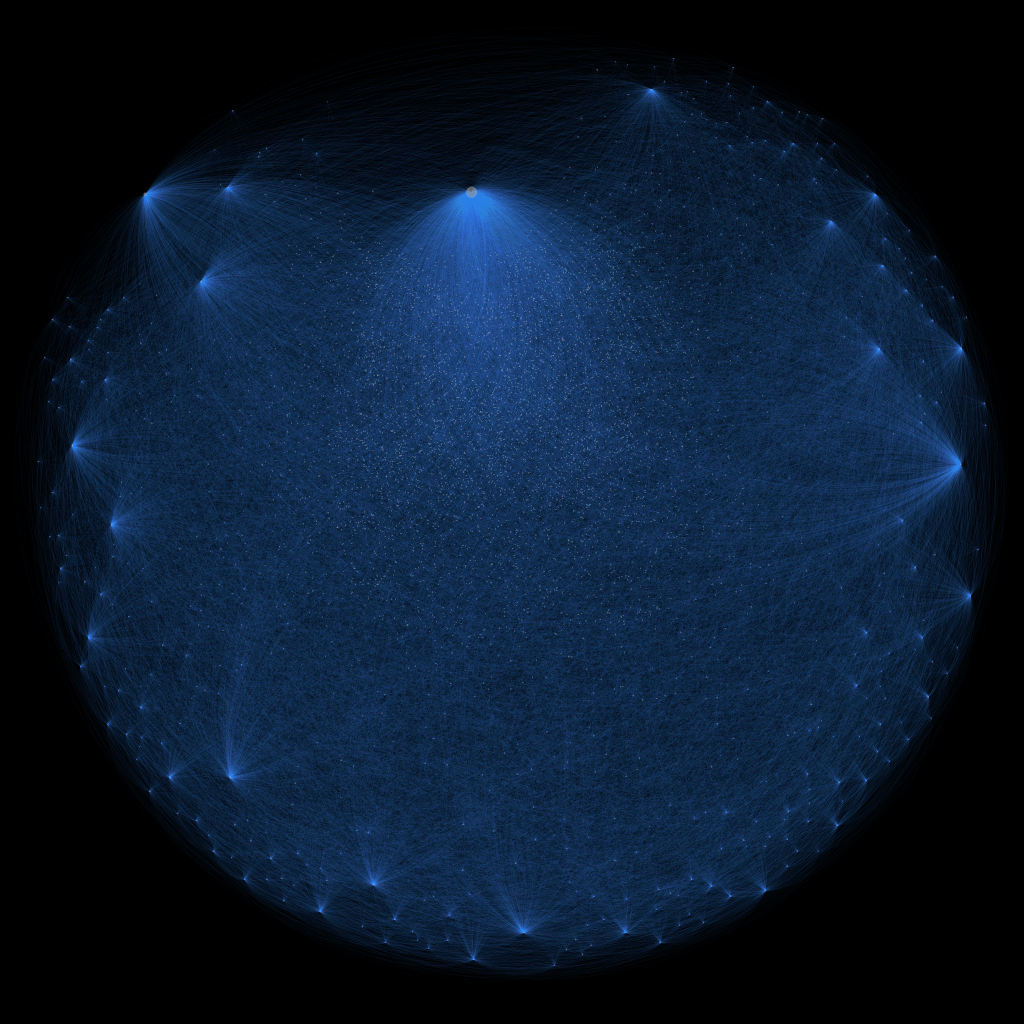
The World Wide Web saw significant expansions during the 2010s.

Internet users grew from covering 29% to 54% of the world population.

Over the course of the 2010s, Baidu, Twitter and Instagram emerged to become among the top 10 most-visited websites (becoming the 4th, 6th and 8th most popular websites by the end of the decade), while Wikipedia went the 9th to 5th most popular website, almost sextupling its monthly visits (from 1 to 5.7 billion). Meanwhile, Yahoo significantly declined in popularity, descending from being the 1st to 9th most popular site, with monthly visits declining by two-thirds (going from 11.6 to 3.9 billion). Google, Facebook, YouTube and Yandex maintained relatively consistent popularity and remained within the top 10 throughout the decade. In 2015, Discord, one of the largest instant messaging social platforms was launched.

==== YouTube ====
The video sharing website YouTube was launched in 2005 and became increasingly popular during the 2010s, especially among younger people, as memes shifted the meaning of entertainment. Memes and trends like Nyan Cat, Dat Boi, "We Are Number One", Trollface, Pepe the Frog, bottle flipping, Condescending Wonka (Gene Wilder died in 2016), emerged on YouTube; the use of YouTube and the internet also lead to new and popular vernacular like poggers, bae, Netflix and chill, "chillax" (a combo of "chill" and "relax") and "on fleek".

Early in the decade channels like Fred Figglehorn (FRED), The Annoying Orange, Ray William Johnson, CollegeHumor, Smosh, PewDiePie and the Angry Video Game Nerd attracted millions of views, channels and videos becoming viral on the site. The popularity of YouTubers even ended up spawning films based on popular YouTubers, including Angry Video Game Nerd: The Movie (2014), Smosh: The Movie (2015), and the Fred Trilogy (2010–2012) starting with Fred: The Movie. These YouTubers became well known through comedic skits, video game reviews, and "Let's Play" videos.

Zach King became widely known as "an online magician" for creating short videos featuring visual effects and optical illusions. He began posting content on YouTube in 2008 and gained widespread recognition on Vine in 2013 for his six-second "magic vines." After Vine was shut down in 2016, his magic vines were reposted as compilations on YouTube and he continued to create new short films and compilations on the site.

Children's content on YouTube was largely dominated by kid-made content involving kids unboxing toys and going on adventures. Many popular channels in this style included Ryan's World, ToyLabTV, Extreme Toys TV and Vlad and Niki. Nerf battles were also a very popular trend on YouTube.

Several new videos and series that debuted on YouTube in the 2010s and achieved popularity included Don't Hug Me I'm Scared, Double Rainbow, Marcel the Shell with Shoes On, Lucas the Spider, Game Grumps, and Critical Role.

Other YouTubers that constantly received views within the millions or went viral during the decade included the likes of bill wurtz for his "history of japan" and "history of the entire world i guess" videos (and music like "and the day goes on"), Swoozie, Etika (and his fanbase the "JOYCONBOYZ"), REACT, WatchMojo, The Joe Rogan Experience, The Nostalgia Critic, Studio C, Babish Culinary Universe, Good Mythical Morning, Penguinz0, Vsauce, CGP Gray, Kurzgesagt, Matpat, MrBeast, Scott the Woz, TheOdd1sOut, Domics, and Jaiden Animations among many others. YouTube itself would even end up banning controversial content creators like ImJayStation and LeafyIsHere during the decade.

YouTube made an annual video series called YouTube Rewind where it would be a recap of each year's YouTubers, viral videos, trends, events, music and memes from 2010 to 2019. The 2018 and 2019 installments was heavily criticized by YouTubers, critics, and viewers alike, receiving millions of dislikes. Rewind did not return for 2020 due to the COVID-19 pandemic, and YouTube announced the following year that the series would be discontinued leading to other YouTubers to make their own YouTube Rewind videos.

=== Film ===
In January 2010, James Cameron's Avatar surpassed $1 billion in sales, becoming the first movie of the decade to do so, and surpassed $2 billion in sales by February 2010. The following year, Harry Potter and the Deathly Hallows – Part 2 became one of the fastest grossing films of all time, and became the highest-grossing film of 2011. 2019's Joker became the first R rated movie to gross over $1 billion and cemented itself in popular culture by making the "Joker Stairs" a famous tourist destination in New York City at the end of the decade. Motion capture grew in terms of its realism and reach, and was seen in movies like Steven Spielberg's Ready Player One, Pirates of the Caribbean, The Avengers, and The Hobbit: An Unexpected Journey.

==== Superhero films and franchises ====
Superhero films became box office leaders, especially with the start of The Infinity Saga of the Marvel Cinematic Universe in 2008 with movies such as the Avengers franchise.

Marvel's main competitor, DC Extended Universe also began to produce superhero films starting in 2013, with films such as Justice League releasing in 2017.

In 2012, a midnight screening of Christopher Nolan's third and final Batman film, The Dark Knight Rises, at a local film theatre in Aurora, Colorado lead to one of the worst mass shootings in American history, claiming the lives of twelve people and others injured, and increased discussions on cinema security.

==== Other prominent franchises ====
The epic space-opera franchise Star Wars saw a resurgence throughout its decade with the third trilogy aka the sequel trilogy of the franchise and the final act of the "Skywalker Saga". These films include Star Wars: The Force Awakens, Star Wars: The Last Jedi, and Star Wars: The Rise of Skywalker with all of them raking in over $4 billion with the first movie became the 3rd highest-grossing film of all time at its release.

The science fiction Universal franchise Jurassic Park also saw a resurgence and popularity with the release of Jurassic World and Jurassic World: Fallen Kingdom. Both of these films each garnered over $1 billion in revenue with the first film became the 3rd highest-grossing film of all time and the second film became the 12th highest-grossing film of all time. Reception of the first movie was positive while the second movie had mixed reviews from critics and fans.

The action racing heist spy franchise The Fast and the Furious continued on from the 2000s and became commercially successful in the 2010s becoming one of Universal's biggest franchises besides Jurassic Park and was the eighth highest-grossing film series. Films include Fast Five, Fast & Furious 6, Furious 7, and The Fate of the Furious.

==== Horror films ====
The horror film It, which was based on the novel of the same name by Stephen King, became the highest-grossing horror film of all time. 2018 saw the acclaimed Halloween sequel, Halloween, the 11th installment of the Halloween franchise and sequel to the first film, Halloween.

==== Animated films ====
Disney, Pixar, DreamWorks, Illumination, and Sony Pictures Animation have dominated the animated films market and have also gained popularity in this decade. The highest-grossing and critically successful franchises included Frozen, How to Train Your Dragon, Hotel Transylvania, The Lego Movie, Kung Fu Panda, Despicable Me, Tinker Bell and Toy Story sequels. Other critically and/or commercially successful films released in this decade included Spider-Man: Into the Spider-Verse, Inside Out, Tangled, Coco, Zootopia, Song of the Sea, Ernest & Celestine, Megamind, Moana, Brave, Wreck-It Ralph, Big Hero 6, The Boss Baby, The Illusionist, Loving Vincent, Klaus, ParaNorman, Hair Love, Kubo and the Two Strings, In a Heartbeat, My Life as a Courgette, The Red Turtle, Shaun the Sheep Movie, and Isle of Dogs.

==== Other films/genres ====
The 2010s saw the release of many Disney live-action remakes based on Disney animated movies: Alice in Wonderland and its sequel Alice Through the Looking Glass, The Sorcerer's Apprentice, Maleficent and its sequel Maleficent: Mistress of Evil, Cinderella, The Jungle Book, The Lion King, Beauty and the Beast, Aladdin, and Christopher Robin. Many of these movies were met with mixed reviews from critics and audiences but were financially successful at the box office, especially The Lion King which grossed over $1.6 billion and became the 7th-highest-grossing film of all time as well as the 2nd-highest-grossing film of 2019.

Disney also produced many live action films based on their theme park attractions and on other existing IP. This included movies like Tomorrowland, A Wrinkle In Time, Into the Woods, John Carter, The Sorcerer's Apprentice and The Lone Ranger. Most of these films received mixed responses from critics audiences and were generally unsuccessful at the box office, though in retrospect some of these films (particularly Tomorrowland) have come to be viewed as "emerging cult films".

Disney Channel's Descendants franchise garnered popularity and high viewership with its first three films during the decade along with releasing a short animated series Wicked World. Halloween costumes of the characters also became one of the most searched costumes every year since the release of the first film.

==== Acclaimed movies ====
The decade also saw many popular and critically acclaimed theatrical releases of varying genres, such as The Social Network, Her, 12 Years a Slave, Moonlight, Boyhood, The DUFF, Me and Earl and the Dying Girl, The Edge of Seventeen, The Fault in Our Stars, The Wolf of Wall Street, The Artist, The Perks of Being a Wallflower, Diary of a Wimpy Kid, Scott Pilgrim vs. the World, The Grand Budapest Hotel, Easy A, Rust and Bone, Two Days, One Night, Whiplash, 21 Jump Street, Eighth Grade, Steve Jobs, Paddington and its sequel Paddington 2, Lady Bird, La La Land, Green Book, Get Out, Parasite, Spring Breakers, Love, Simon, Once Upon a Time in Hollywood, Uncut Gems and To All the Boys I've Loved Before.

The critically acclaimed movies of the 2010s mentioned above set new precedents. Movies like Boyhood (2014) were filmed over the span of a decade in real time to show the growth and childhood of a young boy, and Uncut Gems (2019) brought Adam Sandler back to a wide screen release, while teenage movies like The Edge of Seventeen (2016), Me and Earl and the Dying Girl (2015), The Fault in Our Stars (2014), and The Perks of Being a Wallflower (2012) gained large popularity. Her (2013) became Spike Jonze's highest-grossing and most critically acclaimed movie, noted for its filming locations and art direction, Two Days, One Night (2014) became the Dardenne brothers' highest-grossing film and the first to receive an Oscar nomination, with Marion Cotillard becoming the first actor to be nominated for an Oscar for a Belgian film. Parasite (2019) became the first foreign film to win best picture, and movies like Ready Player One (2018) helped advance motion capture technologies (winning two Outstanding Achievement Awards from the Visuals Effects Society and a Saturn Award for Best Science Fiction Film), in addition to becoming one of Spielberg's highest-grossing films.

=== Television ===
The 2010s decade is often said to be a part of the Golden Age of Television, due to the widespread quality of multiple shows, as well as advancements in technology leading to streaming, cable television, and online outlets bringing this quality and quantity of programming. Cable providers saw a decline in subscriber numbers as cord-cutting viewers switched to lower-cost online streaming services such as Netflix, Amazon Prime, and Hulu. On cable television, as well as streaming services, a variety of shows gained popularity.

==== Live-action TV ====
The comedy sitcom The Big Bang Theory ran for the entirety of the decade, and was the number-one television sitcom for all of its airing prior to its finale in 2019. A prequel series,Young Sheldon premiered in 2017 and ran until 2024. Other sitcoms like Curb Your Enthusiasm, Will & Grace, The Office, Scrubs: Med School, Black-ish, and Netflix's Trailer Park Boys were popular in the 2010s. How I Met Your Mother (narrated by Bob Saget) gained controversy for its 2014 finale, "Last Forever", which sparked an alternate finale to be created for the show, a television first. Cult shows like the dark comedy sitcom It's Always Sunny in Philadelphia carried its popularity from the 2000s and lasted through the entirety of the 2010s. CBS's Two Broke Girls began its run in 2011 (ending in 2017), its pilot being the highest watched on the network in a decade. In 2011, Charlie Sheen was fired from Two and a Half Men, who made his last appearance in the show in Season 8 during February 2011. Sheen's 2011 outbursts and firing from the show were highly publicized. Indian sitcom Taarak Mehta Ka Ooltah Chashmah became the world's longest-running sitcom, with over 2,500 episodes.

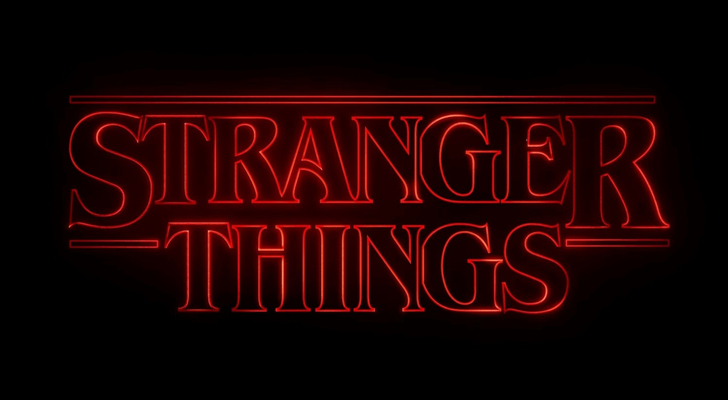
Stranger Things became a massive hit following its release in July 2016.

Dramas like Breaking Bad (2008–2013), The Walking Dead (2010–2022), Game of Thrones (2011–2019) and the Breaking Bad spin-off Better Call Saul (2015–2022) became some of the most popular American television series of all time. Netflix's Stranger Things (2016–2025) gained a massive following during the decade among teen and youth, and 2019's Stranger Things 3 gained even more recognition for the character of Robin Buckley, who was popularized online. The first season of Stranger Things averaged ratings of around 14.07 million adults between the ages of 18 and 49 in the United States, making it the third most-watched season of Netflix original content in the U.S. at the time.

Science fiction television gained a renewed sense of interest, thanks in part to Black Mirror was popularized on Netflix after being broadcast on British television.

A new era of family television and tween television existed in the 2010s, sitcoms of which were mainly spearheaded by Disney and Nickelodeon, but also appeared on cable channels such as ABC (The Middle on ABC for example) and on streaming services like Netflix. Nickelodeon and Disney Channel (as well as Disney XD) continued to dominate kids TV with many popular shows such as iCarly, Victorious, Big Time Rush, Good Luck Charlie, Jessie, Austin & Ally, Shake It Up, K.C. Undercover, Kickin' It, Lab Rats, Henry Danger, Girl Meets World, Andi Mack and Raven's Home, along with PBS Kids' Odd Squad and Nick Jr.'s Dino Dan, both of which were produced by Sinking Ship Entertainment. The short-lived 2018 revival of Roseanne (a family sitcom on ABC) gained attention for the firing of its main star Roseanne Barr and her outbursts.

==== Reality television ====
Reality television grew an increased following during the decade. Kitchen Nightmares, Hell's Kitchen, and Hotel Hell gained popularity on cable television, as well as getting millions of views on YouTube, making Gordon Ramsay a prominent celebrity chef. America's Got Talent drew in viewers when radio personality Howard Stern announced his joining of the show in late 2011, staying as host until 2015. Meanwhile, popular reality programming on ABC included What Would You Do?, Shark Tank and The Bachelor. Corinne Olympios also gained recognition on the 2017 season of The Bachelor for her behavior on set. American Idol remained popular into the beginning of the decade, as did The Voice. Impractical Jokers flourished throughout the 2010s, gaining exposure on YouTube and elsewhere. TMZ became a popular television show and news source in the 2010s on cable television and YouTube respectively. A genre of pawn shows emerged like Pawn Stars and Hardcore Pawn.

The Apprentice was a reality television show that starred media personality and businessman Donald Trump as host until 2015, at which time he resigned as host. Trump would use the success he gained on The Apprentice to run for President of the United States; which he was elected to in 2016. Additionally, programs such as The Celebrity Apprentice, Comedy Central's The Roast Of Donald Trump, and Donald Trump's November 2015 hosting of Saturday Night Live, would send the reality TV star and businessman into the spotlight to help win the U.S. presidency. Governor in the early 2010s and movie star Arnold Schwarzenegger took Trump's place on The Celebrity Apprentice but quit the show in 2017 due to his disapproval of Trump.

==== Animation television ====
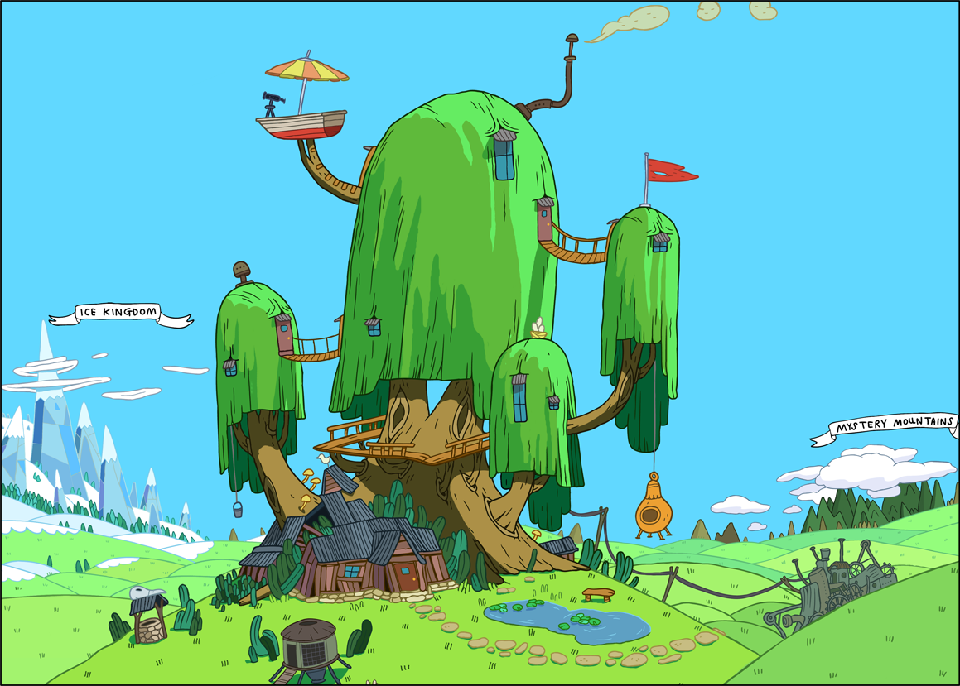
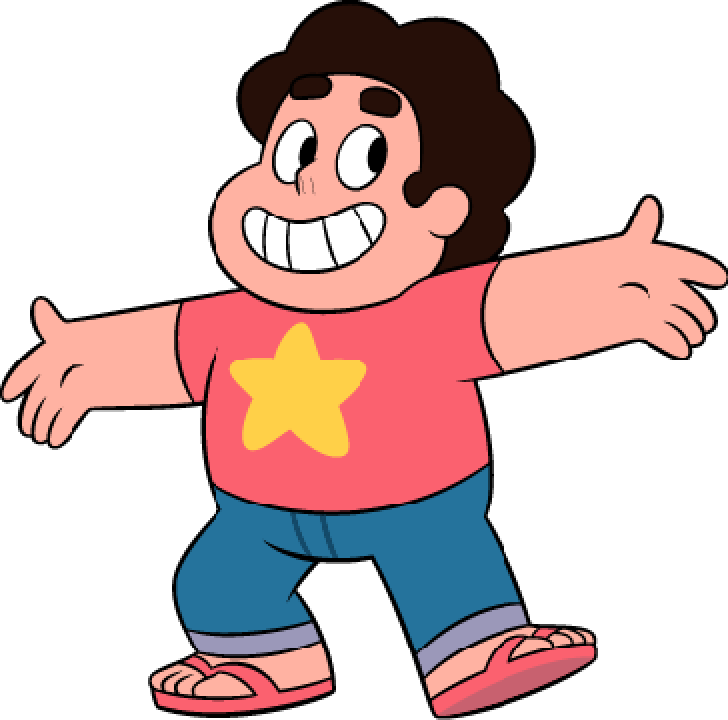
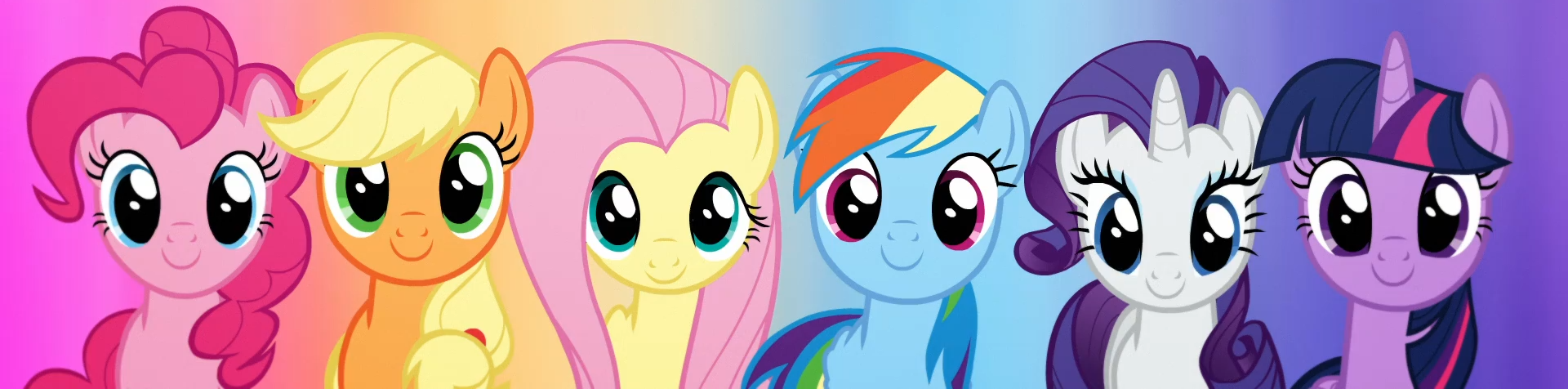
Cartoons like Adventure Time, Steven Universe, and My Little Pony: Friendship is Magic became popular in the 2010s.

Nickelodeon, Cartoon Network and Disney Channel (as well as its sibling channel Disney XD) continued to dominate with cartoons. Popular cartoons of the 2010s included the likes of Adventure Time, Regular Show, Steven Universe, Gravity Falls, The Amazing World of Gumball, Star vs. the Forces of Evil, DuckTales (2017), Miraculous: Tales of Ladybug & Cat Noir, Teenage Mutant Ninja Turtles (2012), Over the Garden Wall, Big City Greens, The Loud House, Amphibia, Mickey Mouse, Strawberry Shortcake's Berry Bitty Adventures, Barbie: Life in the Dreamhouse and My Little Pony: Friendship Is Magic (which became a pop culture phenomenon in its own right and spawned a loyal cult following known as the "bronies"), along with long-running cartoons SpongeBob SquarePants, Phineas and Ferb, Arthur and WordGirl. Nickelodeon brought back three classic Nicktoons; Hey Arnold!, Rocko's Modern Life (which was themed around late 2010s culture), and Invader Zim near the end of the decade, turning them into reboot films.

Nick Jr., Disney Junior and PBS Kids led mainstream educational cartoons with many popular shows including Paw Patrol, Sofia the First, Daniel Tiger's Neighborhood, Doc McStuffins, Jake and the Never Land Pirates, Dinosaur Train, Wild Kratts, PJ Masks, Team Umizoomi, Bubble Guppies, Octonauts and The Cat in the Hat Knows a Lot About That!, along with long-running hits Mickey Mouse Clubhouse, Curious George, Super Why!, Dora the Explorer and Peppa Pig.

Anime broadened its appeal worldwide with shows such as Attack on Titan, Akame ga Kill!, Assassination Classroom, Future Diary, Deadman Wonderland, Madoka Magica, Mob Psycho 100, Darling in the Franxx, Dragon Ball Super, Fairy Tail, Gate, Black Clover, Tokyo Ghoul, Given, KonoSuba, Food Wars!, Haikyu!!, Sailor Moon Crystal, Seraph of the End, One Piece, Overlord, Kaguyasama: Love is War, Bleach, Hunter × Hunter, One Punch Man, Little Witch Academia, Devilman Crybaby, My Hero Academia, JoJo's Bizzarre Adventure, Vinland Saga, Parasyte -the maxim-, Re:Zero and Steins;Gate, separately Japanese reality shows like Terrace House: Boys & Girls in the City reached new and international audiences because of the use of the internet and streaming services (it was Netflix's first international release and one of their earliest international releases). Anime was also viewed on services of the era like Crunchyroll and Funimation.

Newer adult animation grew rapidly throughout the decade with shows such as Rick and Morty, F Is for Family, BoJack Horseman, Superjail! (continuing from the 2000s), Archer (continuing from 2009), Big Mouth, and Bob's Burgers among many others; while long-running adult animations like Family Guy, Futurama, South Park, The Simpsons, Robot Chicken, and 2011's Beavis and Butt-Head revival remained popular.

=== Music ===
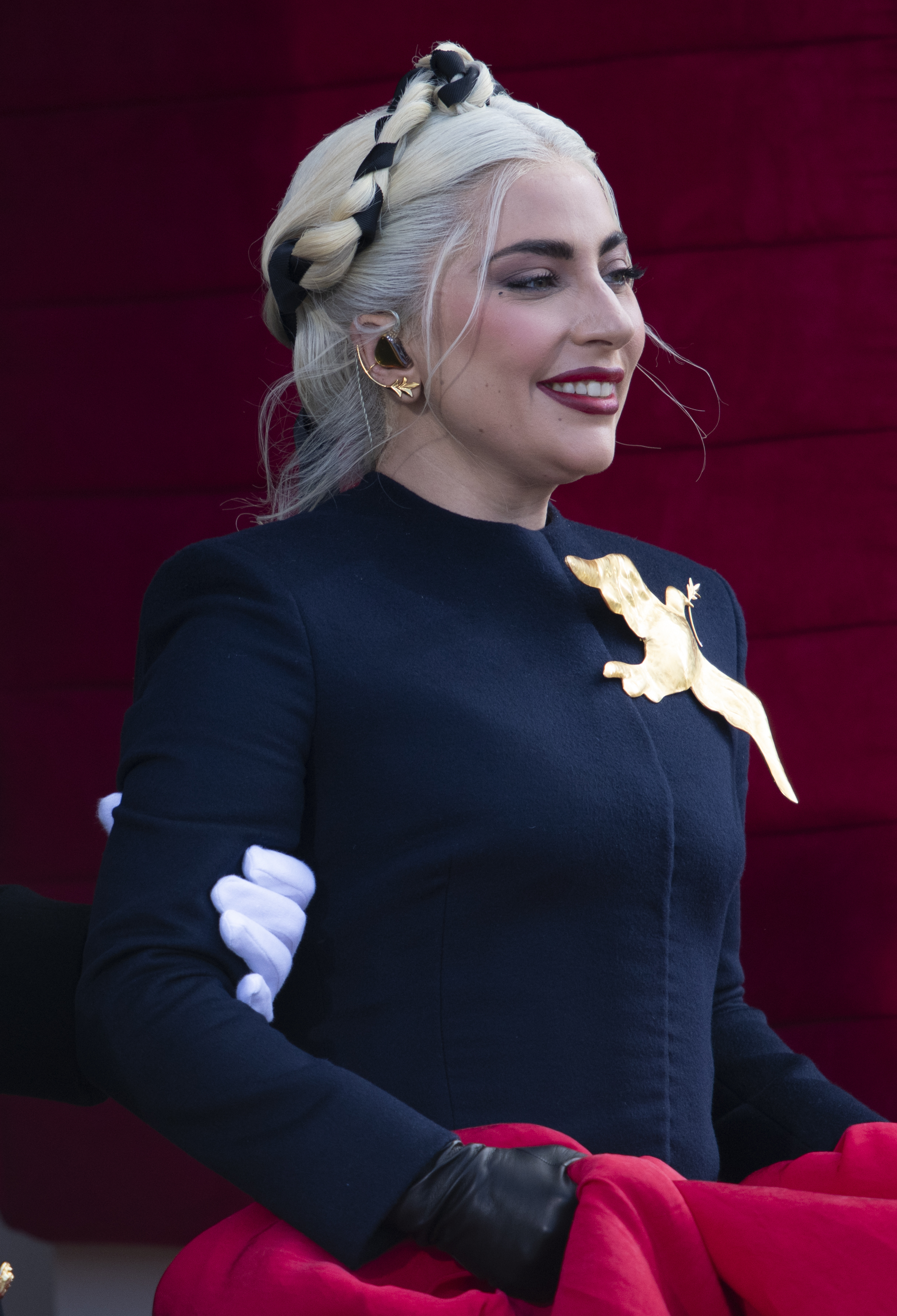
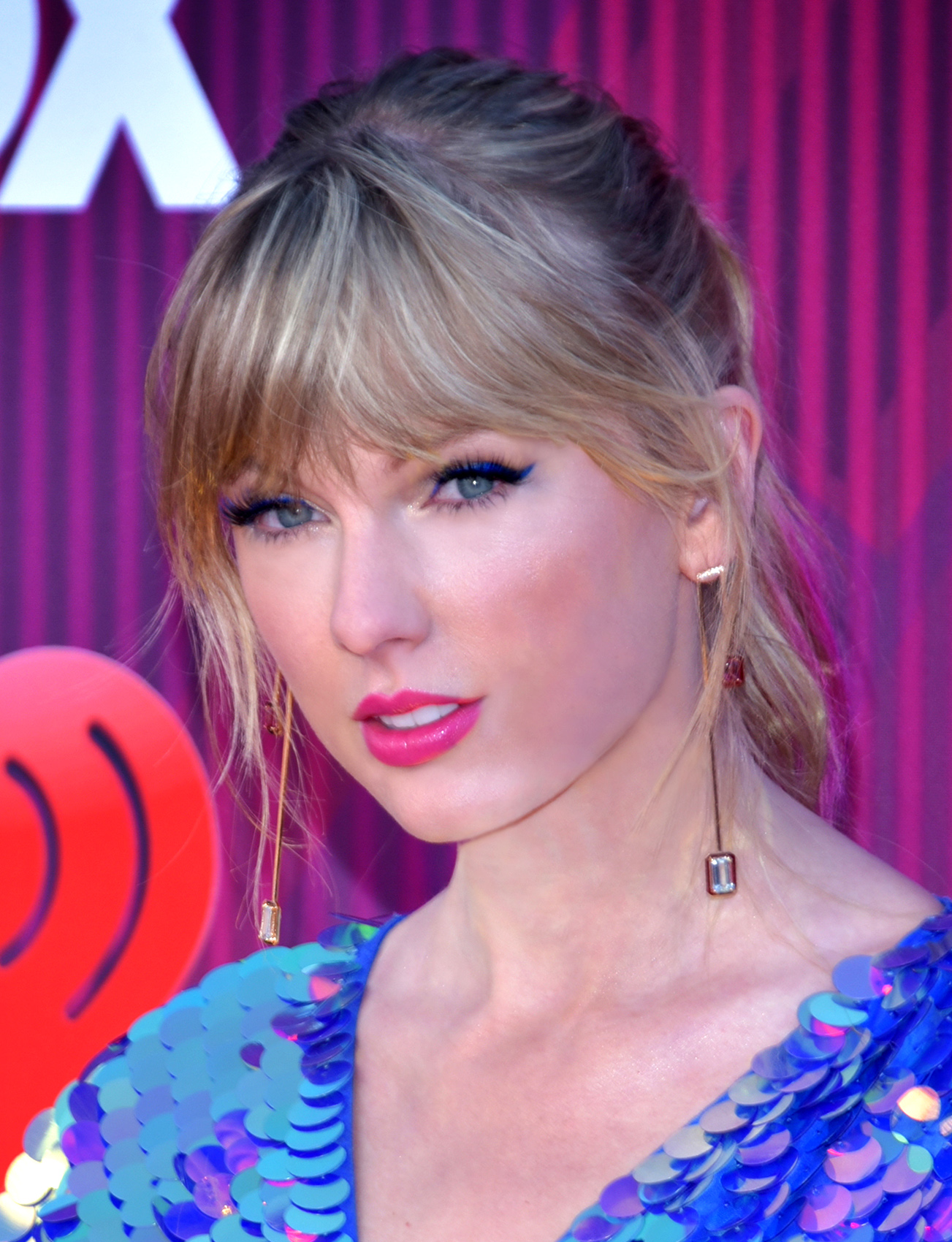
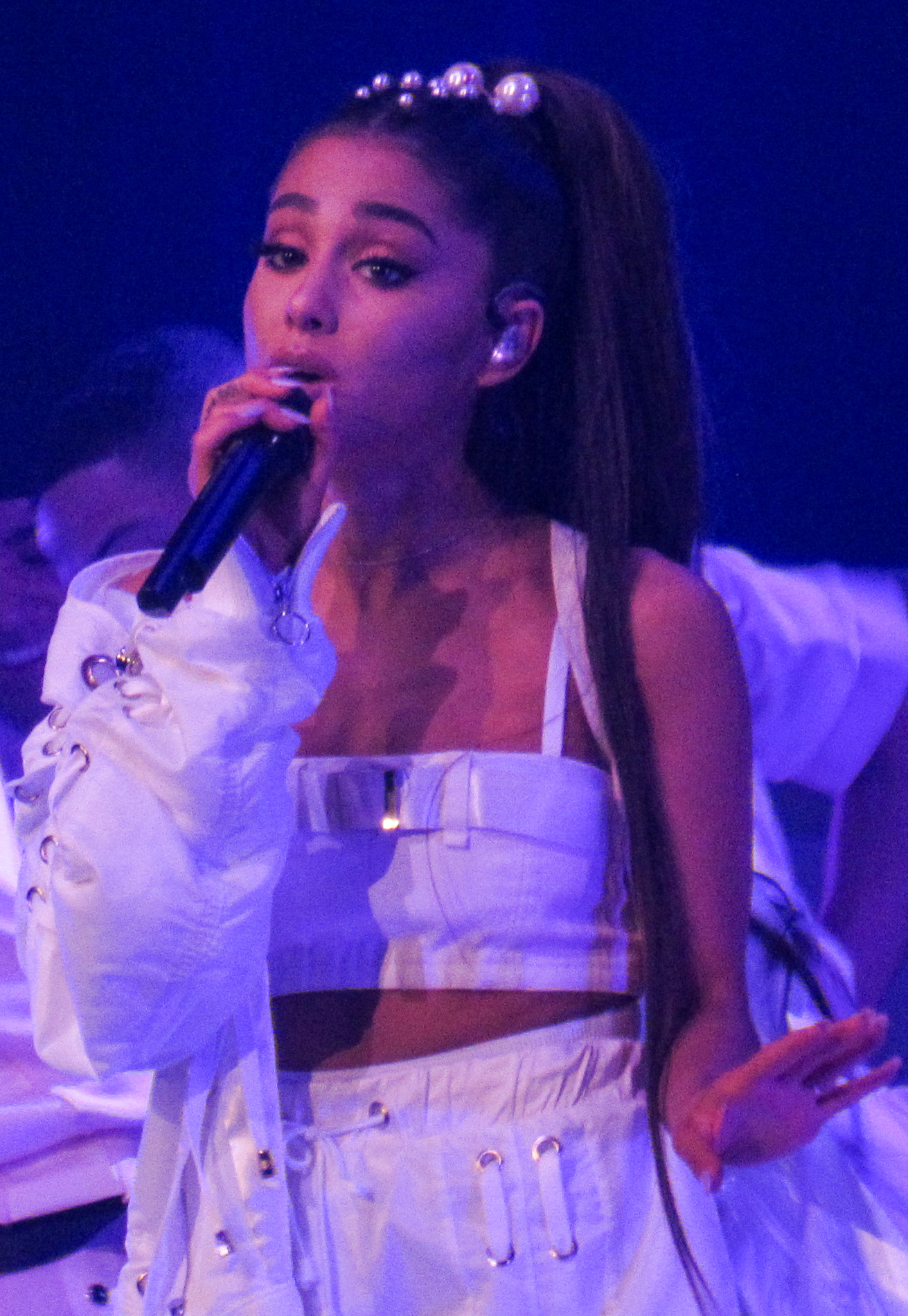
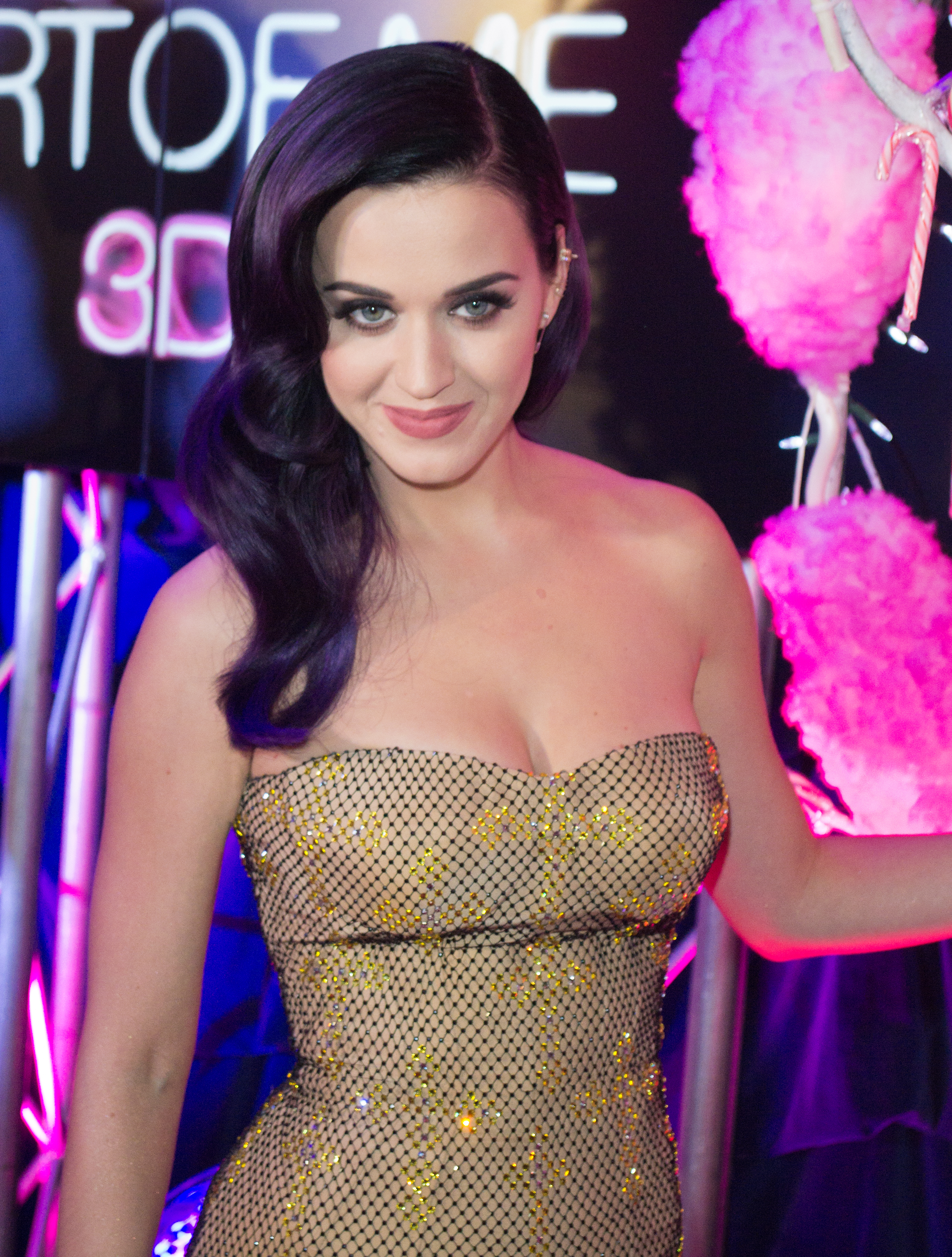
Lady Gaga, Taylor Swift, Ariana Grande and Katy Perry were some of the most famous and influential artists of the 2010s.

Globalism and an increased demand for variety and personalisation in the face of music streaming services such as Spotify and Apple Music created many new subgenres. US digital music sales topped CD sales in 2012. Dance, hip-hop, and pop music surged in the 2010s, with hip-hop and R&B surpassing rock as the biggest US music genre in 2018.

==== Genres ====
Electronic dance music (EDM) achieved mass commercial success in the middle of the decade but fell somewhat into decline by the end. The mass global appeal of EDM music (and subgenres such as dubstep, electro house and trap) from the early-to-mid part of the decade spawned the rise in fame of DJs and digital music producers, such as Skrillex, Tiësto, Avicii, Steve Aoki, Deadmau5, Calvin Harris, Baauer and Diplo.

Country music also saw a resurgence throughout the 2010s in the United States, with artists like Luke Bryan, Jason Aldean, Blake Shelton, Carrie Underwood, Eric Church, Kacey Musgraves, Chris Stapleton and Florida Georgia Line topping the charts and garnering many music industry awards.

With the rise of the internet in the 2010s, independent music gained a large international cult following, with successful indie bands being Foster the People, Dr. Dog, Tally Hall, Florence and the Machine, Beach House, Alt-J, Of Monsters and Men, the National, Two Door Cinema Club, and M83; as well as successful indie solo artists being Tame Impala, Neil Cicierega, St. Vincent, Father John Misty, Ellie Goulding, Feist, Sufjan Stevens, Lana Del Rey, Justin Vernon and Lorde.

==== Artists ====
Musical artists such as Lady Gaga, Taylor Swift, Justin Bieber, Katy Perry, Bruno Mars, Rihanna and Nicki Minaj sold millions of records in the 2010s.

Billboard named Drake the top artist of the decade in the US.

Several prominent musicians from past decades died in the 2010s, including Ronnie James Dio and Lena Horne in 2010, Gil Scott-Heron and Amy Winehouse in 2011, Whitney Houston, Etta James, Donna Summer, Jenni Rivera and Adam Yauch in 2012, Lou Reed in 2013, Joe Cocker in 2014, Ben E. King, B. B. King, Natalie Cole, Lesley Gore and Lemmy Kilmister in 2015, David Bowie, Glenn Frey, Phife Dawg, Merle Haggard, Prince, Juan Gabriel, Pete Burns, Leonard Cohen, Christina Grimmie and George Michael all in 2016, Chuck Berry, Chris Cornell, Prodigy, Tom Petty and Della Reese in 2017, Aretha Franklin and Dolores O'Riordan in 2018, and Keith Flint in 2019. There were also several deaths of newer hip-hop artists who had started or first became successful in the 2010s, including Capital Steez, Lil Peep, XXXTentacion, Mac Miller, Nipsey Hussle, Juice Wrld and others.

=== Video games ===
==== Video game companies and products ====
The video game industry continued to be dominated by Nintendo, Sony, and Microsoft; Minecraft became the best-selling game of all time in 2019.

Sony's PlayStation 4 and Microsoft's Xbox One were released in 2013, and in the United States the PlayStation 4 became the highest-selling console of the decade, surpassing Nintendo, releasing games such as Marvel's Spider-Man, God of War, Uncharted 4, The Last of Us, and Bloodborne. The Nintendo Switch launched in 2017 and was responsible for bringing Nintendo's success back, the success of the console initially spawned by the strong sales of Super Smash Bros. Ultimate, The Legend of Zelda: Breath of the Wild and Super Mario Odyssey, as well as Wii U ports/sequels with Super Mario Maker (Wii U) and Super Mario Maker 2 (Nintendo Switch), Splatoon (Wii U) and Splatoon 2 (Nintendo Switch), and updated "Deluxe" versions of Mario Kart 8 and New Super Mario Bros. U, among many others. Micro-consoles also emerged during the decade, a notable example being the Ouya, a system which was a commercial and critical failure that received attention online.

Since 2013, console game revenue was overtaken by PC gaming revenue. Nvidia released the GeForce RTX 20 series in 2018, introducing ray tracing technology to PC gaming. In December 2018 Epic Games launched the Epic Games Store in an attempt to compete with the largest digital distribution platform for PC games, Valve Corporation's Steam.

Handheld gaming console revenue was overtaken by mobile gaming revenue in 2011, due to the rise of smartphones and freemium apps. The use of iPods, tablets, and cell phones became one of the most popular forms of gaming as the decade progressed with the rise of mobile games, expanding the industry's appeal among less traditional markets such as women and older adults. Gaming apps such as Angry Birds, Cut the Rope, Plants vs. Zombies, Fruit Ninja, Candy Crush, Flappy Bird, Clash of Clans, Temple Run, Smash Hit, Doodle Jump, Geometry Dash, Subway Surfers, and Pokémon Go became huge hits.

The popularity of video games increased across the world, as the Nintendo Wii influenced gaming in the early part of the decade, and the Nintendo 3DS provided 3D gaming through autostereoscopy. The successful Wii was followed by the Wii U in 2012, a commercial failure. Ports and sequels to Wii U games on the Nintendo Switch would sell considerably better than their Wii U counterparts, and even though well-received games like Super Mario 3D World and Nintendo Land released on Wii U, the console still ultimately failed due to poor marketing and public confusion. The Nintendo Wii would be responsible for the most critically acclaimed game of the 2010s decade, Super Mario Galaxy 2 (which is also often considered one of the greatest video games of all time by game critics).

The Wii (and later to a lesser extent the Wii U) would singlehandedly cause the increased use of motion controls in gaming with its Wii line up of games such as Wii Play: Motion, Wii Fit U, Wii Sports Club, Wii Party and Wii Party U, all released in the 2010s. Motion controls would carry over to Nintendo Switch's Joy-Con in 2017, and would form the foundation of 2010's motion-based PlayStation Move and Xbox Kinect, counterparts and competitors to the Wii. In addition to Super Mario Galaxy 2, it is notable in mentioning that Nintendo Wii released a large group of critically acclaimed games in the early 2010s with popular titles such as Kirby's Epic Yarn, Donkey Kong Country Returns (both games later in the decade released on 3DS), The Legend of Zelda: Skyward Sword, and Sonic Colors; as well Portal 2 was a critical success on Xbox and PlayStation early in the decade.

The 2010s marked the growth, release, and large expansion of the "Toys To Life" category. Brands such as Nintendo's Amiibo became massively popular, and allowed figurines to be bought which were scanned into games to level up, train your figurine, or receive goods for your figurine. The Amiibo skyrocketed in success due to the roster of figurines available for Super Smash Bros. for Nintendo 3DS and Wii U, with many posting videos of them online going "amiibo hunting" mostly around late 2014 and 2015. Skylanders and Disney Infinity also remained popular at the time, as fads. The Nintendo Labo released in 2018, was also a part of the "Toys To Life" brand of video games, using cardboard to create objects such as a fishing pole, a crank, and a race-car wheel to be played with games.

==== Online and multiplayer games ====
By the early 2010s, online gaming had become a mainstay of console platforms such as Xbox and PlayStation. During the 2010s, as the number of Internet users increased, two new video game genres rapidly gained worldwide popularity – battle royales and multiplayer online battle arenas (MOBA) – both designed exclusively for multiplayer gameplay over the Internet. First-person shooters were also a popular genre before and during the decade. These genres are commonly played in esports.

Professional gaming, also known as esports, although well known in the 2000s, became tremendously big incurring a large increase in both viewership and prize money. By the late 2010s, it was estimated that the total audience of esports would grow to 454 million viewers, with revenue increasing to more than US$1 billion, with China accounting for 35% of the global esports revenue in 2020. The increasing availability of online streaming media platforms, particularly YouTube and Twitch, have become central to the growth and promotion of esports competitions.

Since the 2010s, a common trend among online games has been operating them as games as a service, using monetization schemes such as loot boxes and battle passes as purchasable items atop freely-offered games. Unlike purchased retail games, online games have the problem of not being permanently playable, as they require special servers in order to function.

==== Let's Plays ====
YouTube and Twitch became platforms for "Let's Players" to upload videos of themselves playing certain games, which led to the popularity of existing games and newer indie games like Cuphead, Doki Doki Literature Club!, Undertale, Terraria, Hotline Miami, Hotline Miami 2: Wrong Number, The Binding of Isaac/The Binding of Isaac: Rebirth, Octodad/Octodad: Dadliest Catch, Shovel Knight, Stardew Valley, and Five Nights at Freddy's (indie games like Cuphead were lauded for its rubber hose animation style, while Undertale's soundtrack like "Megalovania" came to light and Five Nights At Freddy's became well known for its lore).

"Let's Players" were even referenced in greater pop culture such as the 2014 episode Rehash on South Park, where Pewdiepie would be featured onto the show. Jimmy Kimmel would make a sketch parody on his YouTube channel where he would ridicule the "let's plays" culture which led to backlash from the gaming community.

==== Video games and movies ====
In the 2010s movies based on video game franchises became popular, grossing more and being talked about in the media and among fans more than ever before. Movies like Detective Pikachu starring Ryan Reynolds (which starred additional actors like Kathryn Newton as Lucy Stevens and Bill Nighy as Howard Clifford) broke box office records for movies based on game series at the time, while movies like Jim Carrey's debut in Sonic the Hedgehog created buzz in the media and on shows like Conan (where the film and its fans were satirized) in 2019 for the movie's depiction of a more realistic-looking hedgehog character, which by demand of the fans, was changed into a more cartoon version of the titular character to much like and approval upon the November 2019 trailer and movie's release.

In early 2018 Nintendo and Illumination jointly announced (after the 2015 reveal of Nintendo's planned Universal theme parks) that they were working on a Super Mario Bros. movie. The announcement by Nintendo and Illumination was met with internet speculation; the new Illumination Super Mario film replaced the Sony–Nintendo Super Mario film that was leaked during the 2014 Sony Pictures hack.

Video game-themed movies became popular as well, with films such as Ready Player One, Pixels, Scott Pilgrim vs. the World, Wreck-It Ralph, Jumanji: Welcome to the Jungle and Jumanji: The Next Level.

The best-selling games of every year throughout this decade were as follows:

- 2010: Call of Duty: Black Ops
- 2011: Call of Duty: Modern Warfare 3
- 2012: Call of Duty: Black Ops II
- 2013: Grand Theft Auto V
- 2014: Call of Duty: Advanced Warfare
- 2015: Call of Duty: Black Ops III
- 2016: Call of Duty: Infinite Warfare
- 2017: Call of Duty: WWII
- 2018: Red Dead Redemption 2
- 2019: Call of Duty: Modern Warfare

=== Literature ===
The best-selling book of the decade was Fifty Shades of Grey, having sold 15.2 million copies in the United States.

The following is a list of the 10 best-selling books of the decade. Note that global data is unavailable and this is limited to the United States:

- Fifty Shades of Grey – 15.2 million sales
- Fifty Shades Darker – 10.4 million sales
- Fifty Shades Freed – 9.3 million sales
- The Hunger Games – 8.7 million sales
- The Help – 8.7 million sales
- The Girl on the Train – 8.2 million sales
- Gone Girl – 8.1 million sales
- The Fault in Our Stars – 8 million sales
- The Girl with the Dragon Tattoo – 7.9 million sales
- Divergent – 6.6 million sales

The Diary of a Wimpy Kid series also became one of the best-selling book series of all time throughout the 2010s, with installments such as Cabin Fever and The Long Haul winning awards at the Nickelodeon Kids' Choice Awards.

In the comic book industry, Japanese manga began outselling western comics.

=== Sports ===
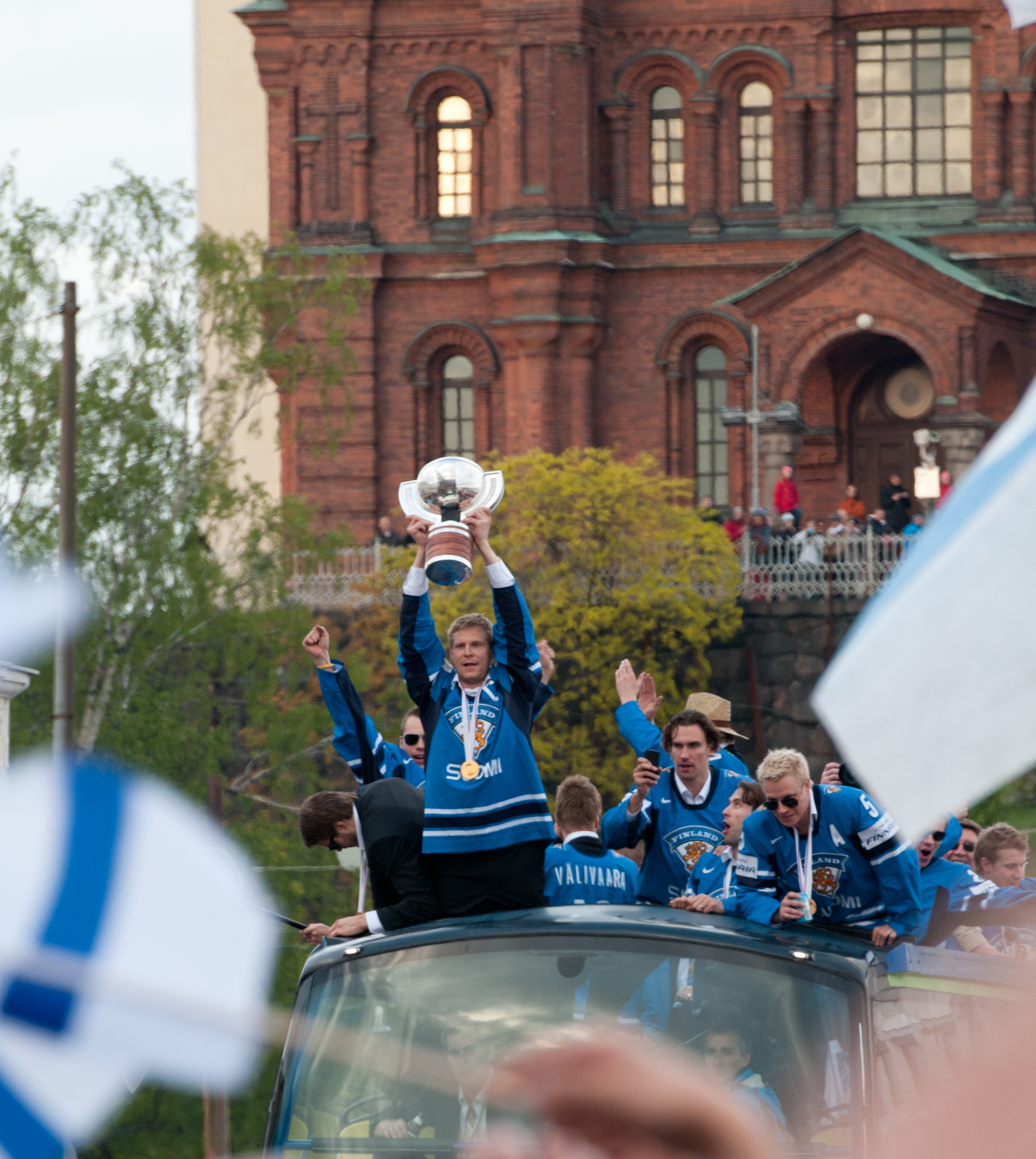
2011 IIHF World Championship gold medal celebrations in Finland

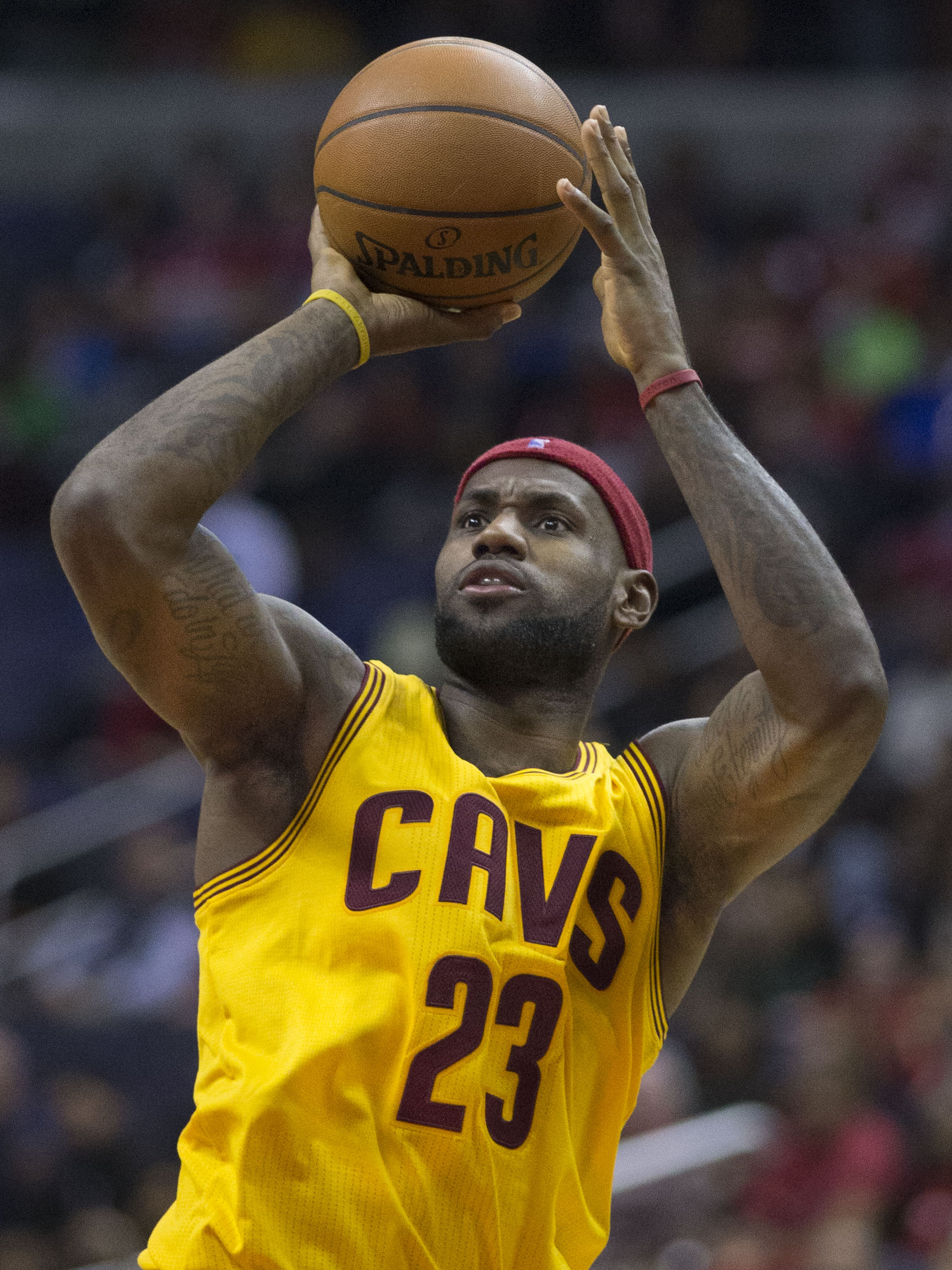
LeBron James, a sports icon of the decade, is the only NBA player to have won four championships with three separate franchises.

Popular athletes of the decade included Alex Ovechkin, Cristiano Ronaldo, Lionel Messi, Virat Kohli, Megan Rapinoe, LeBron James, Kevin Durant, Stephen Curry, Tiger Woods, Tom Brady, Aaron Rodgers, Floyd Mayweather, Manny Pacquiao, Canelo Álvarez, Serena Williams, Novak Djokovic, Lewis Hamilton, Kyle Busch, Conor McGregor, Ronda Rousey, Mike Trout, Michael Phelps, Usain Bolt, Shaun White, Kelly Slater, Simone Biles, Sidney Crosby and many more.

At the 2010 Wimbledon Championships, tennis players John Isner and Nicolas Mahut competed in the longest professional tennis match in history, requiring five sets and 183 games for Isner to ultimately defeat Mahut in a match which lasted 11 hours and 5 minutes, and was played over the course of three days. The most dominant male tennis players were Rafael Nadal, Roger Federer, and Novak Djokovic. Andy Murray was also successful in this decade. Amongst female tennis, Venus and Serena Williams dominated proceedings.

A doping scandal and investigation that was concluded in 2012 led to former professional road racing cyclist Lance Armstrong being stripped of all seven of his Tour de France titles.

On 14 October 2012, skydiver Felix Baumgartner completed a jump from the stratosphere and set world records for the highest skydive (39 km or 24 mi), fastest freefall speed (1,357.64 km/h or 843.6 mph, or Mach 1.25), and became the first person in history to break the sound barrier without vehicular power.

In 2015, after Thoroughbred racehorse American Pharoah won the American Triple Crown and the Breeders' Cup Classic, he became 12th Triple Crown winner in history and the first in more than 30 years, and in winning all four races, became the first horse ever to win the Grand Slam of Thoroughbred racing.

In November 2016, the Chicago Cubs won the World Series for the first time since 1908, over the then-Cleveland Indians. Their win, along with Game 7 and the entire 2016 Series, was heavily noted in the sports and baseball community. It is often considered one of the best World Series ever played, due to the underdog nature of both teams, how close the games were and especially the final game, and how it ultimately ended the over 100-year drought of the Cubs not winning a series.

In Formula 1, Lewis Hamilton won five F1 World Championships during the decade from 2014 to 2019.

In June 2017, rock climber Alex Honnold became the first person in history to free solo climb El Capitan in Yosemite National Park, an accomplishment that one commentator described as "one of the great athletic feats of any kind, ever."

In January 2018, the final play of an NFL playoffs game between the Minnesota Vikings and the New Orleans Saints, dubbed the "Minneapolis Miracle", became the first time in NFL playoffs history where a game ended in a touchdown as time expired, and prompted a change to the NFL's rules as they pertain to extra-point conversion attempts.

==== Football ====
Leicester City won a notable Premier League title in Club Football in 2015–16, with 5000/1 odds at the start of the season. Managers like José Mourinho, Pep Guardiola, Carlo Ancelotti, Jürgen Klopp, Mauricio Pochettino, Didier Deschamps, Antonio Conte, and Luis Enrique were influential during this era of football.

In International Football, European sides won all three World Cups, Spain in 2010, Germany in 2014, and France in 2018. Of the finalists, only one was not European, Argentina in 2014. The other finalists were Croatia in 2018 and the Netherlands in 2010. South Africa hosted the first World Cup of the decade, followed by Brazil and then controversially, Russia in 2018. The Euros were the next biggest footballing tournaments of the decade, with Spain winning the 2012 edition held in Poland and Ukraine, retaining their title from 2008. Iberian dominance persisted in 2016 with Portugal winning their first Major Tournament against France in France. In the Copa America, Uruguay (2011), Chile (2015, 2016) and Brazil (2019) registered tournament wins. In terms of the Africa Cup of Nations, the winners were Egypt in 2010, Zambia in 2012, Nigeria in 2013, Ivory Coast in 2015, Cameroon in 2017, and Algeria in 2019.

Individual accolades were dominated by two players in particular, Cristiano Ronaldo and Lionel Messi. This inspired renewed focus on who the "goat" was, especially in an increasingly online population, with both players winning Ballon d'Ors: Messi with 5, and Ronaldo with 4. The only other player to win a Ballon d'Or this decade was Luka Modrić. The dominance of Ronaldo and Messi was a key feature of the decade, especially because the two players played in the same League for the majority of the decade, with Ronaldo at Real Madrid, and Messi at Barcelona. The two often met in the famous El Clásico fixture.

==== Rugby ====
Rugby was another well-attended sport in this decade. The landscape of club rugby saw the emergence of the Japanese theatre, with big players heading to Japan. Toulon versus Racing 92 in the 2015–16 Top 14 final broke records for club rugby when it clocked over 99,000 in attendance at Camp Nou in Barcelona.

International rugby saw the emergence of several new elite sides, with teams like Ireland as a new major player in the European sphere, and on a larger global sphere, where they peaked at Number 1 in 2019, Wales also saw significant improvement and wins, with their overall achievements leading to a stint at Number 1 in 2019. New Zealand and Japan made headlines during the decade, the latter by beating the South Africa national side in 2015. Wales, England, and Ireland dominated the Six Nations, though France did win in 2010. In the Rugby Championship, Argentina were admitted during the 2011 season, in a general surge in South American rugby, with Uruguay becoming established. New Zealand dominated the Rugby Championship, winning all but 2 of the tournaments, losing out in Rugby World Cup years. Italy earned wins versus France and Ireland as well as a shock win against South Africa alongside semi-regular wins against Scotland.

The Rugby World Cup was held three times in the 2010s, firstly in New Zealand in 2011, where hosts New Zealand beat France 8–7 in the final. New Zealand beat Australia in 2015, 34–17 to become the most successful world cup team and the first team to win Back-to-Back titles. Japan hosted the 2019 World Cup and South Africa, led by their first Black Captain, Siya Kolisi, won against England in the final 32–12. This was a World Cup of firsts, being the first in Asia, and because Japan progressed as top of their Group after famous wins versus Ireland and Scotland and were beaten only by the eventual winners in the Quarter final. It also saw Uruguay get their first World Cup win against Fiji.

== Analysis ==
As the decade drew to a close, some commentators looked back on it as a politically unstable period. An article in the New York Times stated: "With the rise of nationalist movements and a backlash against globalisation on both sides of the Atlantic, the liberal post-World War II order – based on economic integration and international institutions – began to unravel." It heavily discussed the US presidency of Donald Trump (a reality TV star and businessman with no political experience at the time of taking office, succeeding Barack Obama) whilst also commenting, "Echoes of Mr. Trump's nationalist populism can be found in Prime Minister Boris Johnson of Britain's recent electoral victory and the Brexit referendum of 2016, and in the ascent of the far-right President Jair Bolsonaro of Brazil and Prime Minister Narendra Modi of India. Democracy is under threat in Hungary and Poland. Once fringe right-wing parties with openly racist agendas are rebranding themselves in Sweden and Belgium. And far-right groups in Germany and Spain are now the third-largest parties in those nations' parliaments." A December 2019 piece in The Guardian argued that the 2010s would be remembered "as a time of crises", elaborating "there have been crises of democracy and the economy; of the climate and poverty; of international relations and national identity; of privacy and technology". The article also noted that, in Britain, "politics since 2010 has often been manic. Parties have hastily changed their leaders and policies; sometimes their entire guiding philosophies. Last week's general election was the fourth of the decade; the 1980s, 1990s and 2000s had two apiece." Similar trends of political unrest were felt beyond the Western world, as suggested in The Asian Review, which described the 2010s as a "tumultuous time for Asia, sometimes tragic, sometimes triumphant and never dull".

== See also ==
- List of decades

The following articles contain brief timelines which list the most prominent events of the decade:

- 2010
- 2011
- 2012
- 2013
- 2014
- 2015
- 2016
- 2017
- 2018
- 2019
