= Bond =

Bond or bonds may refer to:

== Common meanings ==
- Bond (finance), a type of debt security
- Bail bond, a commercial third-party guarantor of surety bonds in the US
- Fidelity bond, a type of insurance policy for employers
- Chemical bond, the attraction of atoms, ions or molecules to form chemical compounds
- Emotional bond, an emotional attachment between one or more individuals
- Surety bond, a promise by a person or company to pay one party a certain amount if a second party fails to meet some obligation

== People ==
- Bond (surname)
- Bonds (surname)
- Mr. Bond (musician), Austrian rapper

== Arts and entertainment ==
- James Bond, a series of works about the eponymous fictional character
- James Bond (literary character), a British secret agent in a series of novels and films
- Bond (string quartet), an Australian/British string quartet
  - Bond: Video Clip Collection, a video collection from the band
- Bond (Canadian band), a Canadian rock band in the 1970s
- The Bond (1918 film), by Charlie Chaplin supporting Liberty bonds
- The Bond (2024 film), a Spanish thriller film
- The Bond (TV series), a 2021 Chinese drama television series
- Bond International Casino, a former music venue in New York City
- "Bonds" (The Walking Dead), an episode of the television series The Walking Dead
- The Bond, a 2007 American autobiography written by The Three Doctors

== Places ==
=== Antarctica ===
- Bond Glacier, at the head of Vincennes Bay
- Bond Nunatak, Adelaide Island

=== Australia ===
- Bond Island, Queensland, in the Torres Strait

=== Canada ===
- Bond Inlet, a body of water in Hudson Strait
- Bond Street (Toronto)

=== England ===
- Bond Street, a major shopping street in the West End of London
- Bond Street station, a major tube station in London
- Bonds, Lancashire, an English village

=== United States ===
- Bond, Colorado
- Bond, Mississippi
- Bond, Tennessee
- Bond Street (Manhattan), New York City
- Bond Court Building, the former name of a highrise in Cleveland, Ohio
- Bond Falls, a waterfall in the Ontonagon River, Michigan
- Bond House (disambiguation), various National Registered Historic Places in the US

=== Outer space ===
- Bond (crater), on Mars

== Brands and enterprises ==
- BoND, architecture and design firm in New York
- Bond (winery), a Californian wine producer
- Bond Arms, a Texas gun manufacturer
- Bond Aviation Group, a British helicopter operator
- Bond Bridge, a Wi-Fi device that communicates with infra-red controlled devices
- Bond Cars Ltd, a small-scale car manufacturer between 1949 and 1971
- Bond Clothing Stores, a former New York clothing company
- Bond Education Group, a Canadian operator of private schools
- Bonds (clothing), Australian clothing company
- Bonds of Norwich, a department store in Norwich, Norfolk, England, purchased by the John Lewis Partnership and renamed John Lewis Norwich

== Organizations ==
=== Education ===
- Bond University, Gold Coast, Australia
  - Bond South Africa, South African campus of Bond University

=== Other organizations ===
- British Overseas NGOs for Development, operating as Bond, the membership body for UK-based NGOs working in international development
- Brotherhood Organization of a New Destiny (BOND), created by Jesse Lee Peterson

== Other uses ==
- Bond (sheep), an Australian breed of sheep
- Bond paper, a high quality durable writing paper
- Bond (Chinese constellation), both a mansion in the White Tiger constellation and an asterism within that mansion
- Bond, the manner in which the bricks overlap in brickwork
- The Bond of 1844, a treaty between Ghanaian tribes and the British establishing a protectorate over the Gold Coast
- Electrical bonding, the practice of intentionally electrically connecting all exposed metal items not designed to carry electricity in a room or building as protection from electric shock

== See also ==
- Bond v The Queen, a 2000 High Court of Australia case
- Bond v. United States (2000), a U.S. Supreme Court case regarding the Fourth Amendment
- Peace bond, a protection order from a Canadian court
- Bonde (disambiguation)
- Bond(z), a Japanese manga anthology
- Bonding (disambiguation)
