= Bond House =

Bond House, Bonds House, or Bonde House may refer to:

== United States ==
- Bonds House (Fox, Arkansas), listed on the NRHP in Arkansas
- Lloyd–Bond House, Lloyd, FL, listed on the NRHP in Florida
- John R. and Mary Bond House, Carnesville, GA, listed on the NRHP in Georgia
- Bond Family House, Lithonia, GA, listed on the NRHP in Georgia
- Bond-Baker-Carter House, Royston, GA, listed on the NRHP in Georgia
- Bond-Sullivan House, Wichita, KS, listed on the NRHP in Kansas
- J. Roy Bond House, Elizabethtown, KY, listed on the NRHP in Kentucky
- Jeff Bond House, Red Bush, KY, listed on the NRHP in Kentucky
- Bonde Farmhouse, Nerstrand, MN, listed on the NRHP in Minnesota
- Bond House (Biloxi, Mississippi), listed on the NRHP in Mississippi
- Van Reyper-Bond House, Montclair, NJ, listed on the NRHP in New Jersey
- Frank Bond House, Espanola, NM, listed on the NRHP in New Mexico
- Col. William M. and Nancy Ralston Bond House, Lockport, NY, listed on the NRHP in New York

== See also ==
- Bond (disambiguation)
