= Bondre =

Bondre is a surname. Notable people with the surname include:

- Kalyani Bondre (born 1981), Indian academic and classical vocalist
- Rahul Siddhvinayak Bondre, Indian politician
- Vishwanath Bondre (1936–2014), Indian cricketer

== See also ==
- Bonde
