= Bonding =

Bonding may refer to:

== Arts and entertainment ==
- Bonding (TV series), a 2019 Netflix Original TV series
- "Bonding" (Kim Possible), a 2004 episode of the television series Kim Possible
- "The Bonding", a 1989 episode of the television series Star Trek: The Next Generation
- The Bonding (album), a 2013 album by Austrian symphonic metal band Edenbridge
- Bonding (novel), a 2024 novel by Mariel Franklin

== Other uses ==
- Bonding (dental), a dental procedure in which a dentist applies a resin material to the tooth
- Making arrangements to secure a debt by means of a bond
- Bonding as a construction method

== See also ==
- Human bonding
- Female bonding
- Male bonding
- Channel bonding (or modem bonding), an arrangement in which two or more network interfaces on a host computer are combined
  - NIC bonding, an alternate name for link aggregation
- Electrical bonding, practice of connecting all metal objects in a room to protect from electric shock
- Bonding, a method for creating electric interconnects:
  - Ball bonding, a method very similar to wire bonding
  - Chip bonding, a method of wiring some chips (also from different manufactures) together on die an integrated circuit
  - Wire bonding, a method of making interconnections between a microchip and the outside world as part of semiconductor device fabrication
  - Direct bonding
