= Watches of the night =

Ancient practice of dividing the night into periods

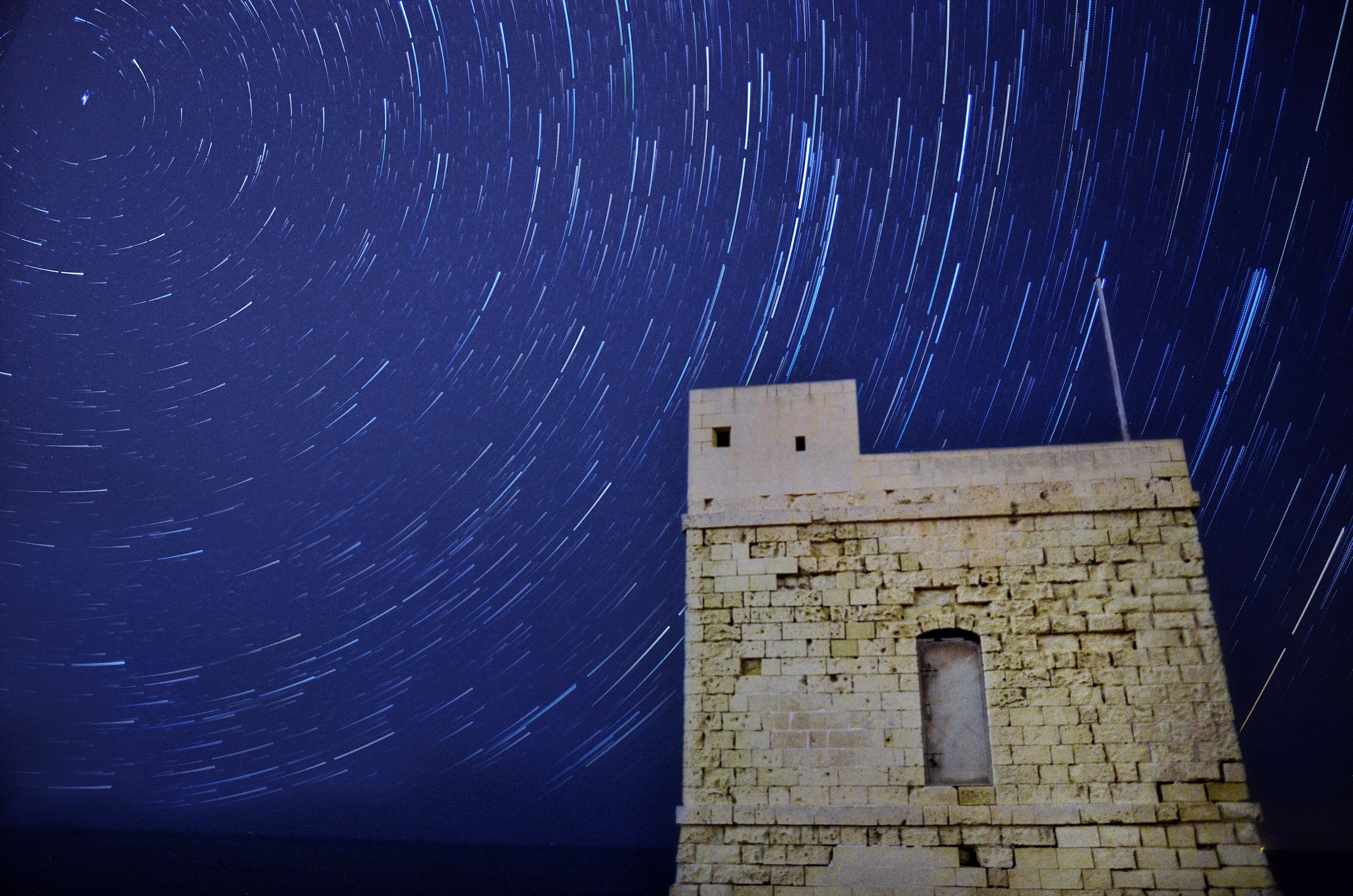
Under Roman rule, four night watches existed, concordant with the changes of the Roman guards on watchtowers, each being of three hours' duration.

The watches of the night, or night watches, refers to the ancient practice of dividing the night into periods for the goal of keeping watch. Lasting from dusk to dawn, guards relieved each other at each of these periods. The Hebrew and Babylonian watches of the night were divided into three military watches; the first (dusk), middle (midnight) and (dawn) watch. As Christianity began, the number of watches increased to four watches due to the influence of the Roman Empire, who used four watches throughout the night.

The phrase "watches of the night" occurs several places in the Old Testament, the New Testament, Rabbinic literature and English literature (Old English, Restoration, Romantic and Victorian literature). The existence of watches of the night in the New Testament conveyed spiritual significance. The phrase is also found in the Dhammapada, a collection of sayings by the Buddha, and as well as in some Hindu texts.

== Definition ==
According to Oxford English Dictionary, the phrase "watches of the night" is related to "Vigils", meaning vigil, which comes from Latin Vigiliae (Greek φυλακή, Hebrew ashmōreth), pertaining to nocturnal watches, such as guards of the soldiers. A "watch" in the bible is a period of time in which a watchman, guard, or a group of guards was to be on duty, especially during the night. The phrase today, as a collective plural, is a literary term used in a rhetoric manner for nighttime, particularly as a time when a person cannot sleep.

== Religions and cultures ==
=== Judaism ===
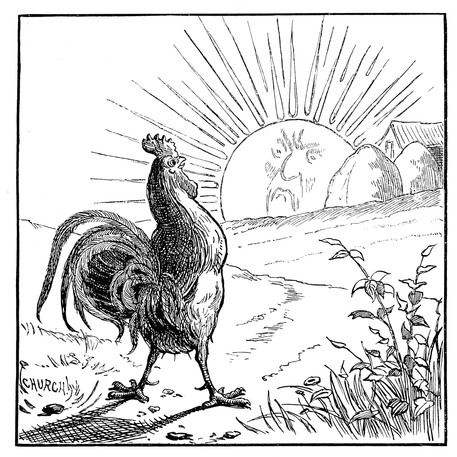
A rooster crowing at sunrise, ending the morning watch

According to Ed Arcton, the Jews divided the night into three watches where each watch represented the period when guards began their duty. The term "watches of the night" is found in Psalms 63:6, which indicates a personal commitment during the night and a time for meditation and prayer, accenting the significance of spiritual alertness. The Jewish calculation acknowledged three such watches, titled the first or "beginning of the watches"' (Lamentations 2:19) (sunset to 10 pm), the middle watch (Judges 7:19) (10 pm to 2 am), and the morning watch (Exodus 14:24; 1 Samuel 11:11) (2 am to sunrise). It was argued by John Lightfoot (in Matthew 14:25) that the Jews rather used four watches, three only being in the dead of the night, and the fourth being in the morning.

According to the Baraita, a tradition in the oral Torah of rabbinical Judaism, "The night consists of three watches, and during each watch the Holy One sits and roars like a lion...The sign for this: in the first watch, a donkey brays; in the second, dogs howl; and in the third, a baby nurses from its mother and a woman converses with her husband." The Mishnah ("ashmurah", "ashmoret" or "mishmarah", meaning "watch") features the old division of three watches conforming to the tradition in the Holy Temple.

=== Christianity and the Roman Empire ===
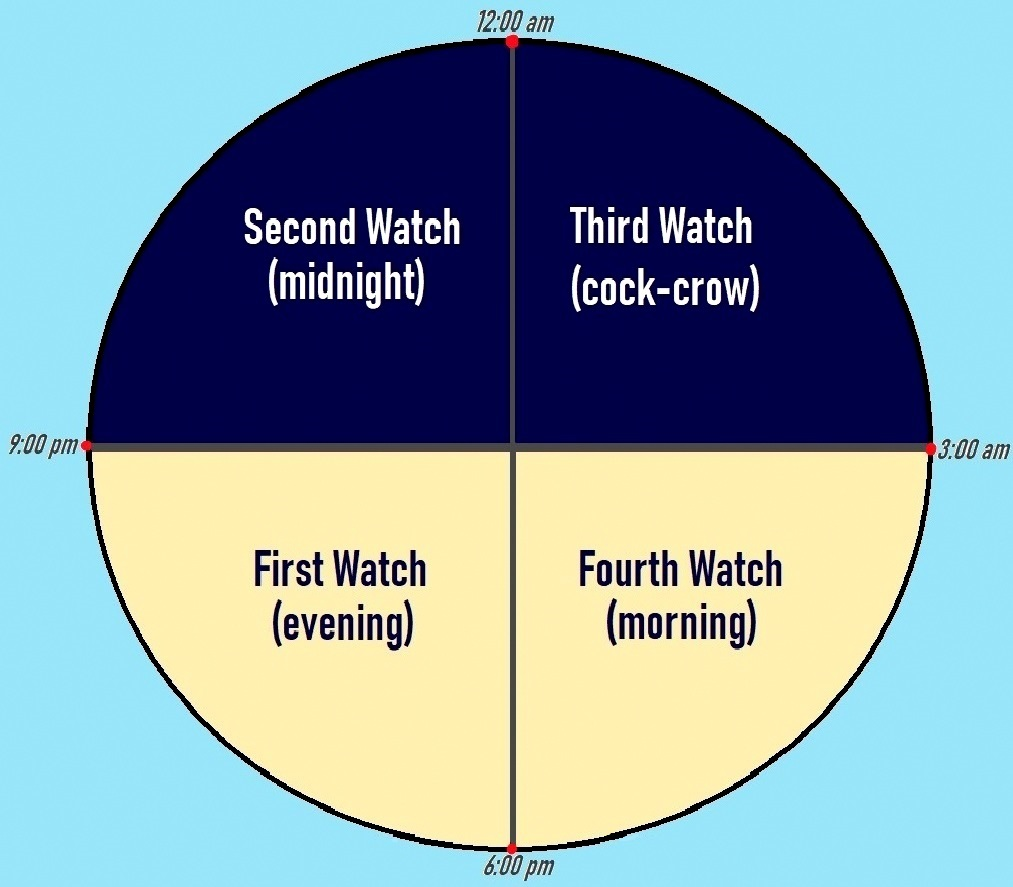
The Roman four watches of the night, which ran from the evening to dawn

According to Ed Arcton, after the influence of the Roman Empire, the number of watches of the night increased to four in Christianity, which were described either numerically, as such as the "third watch" or "fourth watch" (Matthew 14:25, Luke 12:38), or by the terms "even", "midnight", "cock-crowing" and "morning" (Mark 13:35). In Christianity, the four watches of the night are: The first watch (6 pm to 9 pm) or the evening watch, second watch (9 pm to midnight) or the midnight watch, third watch (midnight to 3 am) or the cockcrow watch, and the fourth watch (3 am to 6 am) or the morning watch, all of which indicating a ceaseless and vigilant contemplation on God throughout the night, since nighttime is associated with fear and danger.

The Roman division of nighttime into four watches had pragmatic entailment for security and military operations, as it permitted organized shifts of guards and soldiers. The watches of the night were also used for the purpose of maintaining vigilance and prayer, since the division was manifested in both the Old and New Testaments, where it reflected the cultural and religious practices of the Israelites and early Christians. The use of Roman timekeeping in the Gospels emphasizes the historical circumstance of the New Testament, where Roman governance and Jewish tradition came across with each other.

In the early church, during the night before a feast, a vigil was held between 6 pm and 6 am, a timeframe that was divided into four watches or vigils of three hours each; the first, the second, the third, and the fourth vigil.

=== Buddhism ===
In Buddhism, the phrase is found in the Dhammapada in chapter 12 (Attavaggo), which reads "If one regards oneself as dear one should guard oneself right well, during one of the three watches of the night the wise one should stay alert." The Mahayana tradition associate it to the Buddha's procession through important powers. In Theravada, it embraces multiple characteristics, such as highlighting the Buddha's deep reflection, Ananda's recitation of the Ratana Sutta that displays devotion, and the stages of perception during contemplation on Paticcasamuppada, alongside evaluating the Tathagata's anticipated passing. The true "three knowledges" are said to be constituted by the process of achieving enlightenment, which is what the Buddha is said to have achieved in the three watches of the night of his enlightenment.

=== Hinduism ===
In Hinduism, the phrase "Three watches of the night" represents both the restlessness of Indrajit's father during conflict and the traditional division of nighttime for rest, reflection, and different activities, highlighting the twofold nature of the night. The three watches of the night (tiyāmā) are: paṭhamayāma, majjhimayāma, and pacchimayāma (first, middle, and last watches). The practice of dividing the night in watches was common in the ancient world.

== Literature ==
The phrase "watches of the night" has been used in several works of literature as a cliché for what is also called 'the wee small hours', or 'the early morning', often with connotations of blackness and depression. In English literature, the earliest reference to "watches of the night" is in Old English, where Ælfric of Eynsham states in Homilies vol. II:...on ðære feorðan wæccan. An wæcce hæfð þreo tida; feower wæccan gefyllað twelf tida; swa fela tida hæfð seo niht", which translates to "In the fourth watch. One watch has three hours; four watches fill twelve hours; thus, the night has so many hours."

In 1526, in Middle English, William Bonde writes in Pilgrimage of Perfection: In iewry..the nyght was deuided in to .iiii. partes, whiche they called .iiii. watches." In William Shakespeare's Henry IV, Part 2, the phrase is used in the line, "As he whose brow (with homely biggen bound) Snores out the watch of night", and as well as in Othello; "At this odde Euen and dull watch o' th' night." In Joseph Andrews by Henry Fielding, the second watch is mentioned; "About the second Watch, a general Complaint of Drowth was made". Richard Estcourt uses the phrase in his 1703 comedic play Fair Example; "Husband, I believe the first watch is expir'd".

In 1826, in The Journal of Sir Walter Scott, Walter Scott writes; "The watches of the night pass wearily when disturbd by fruitless regrets". In Memoriam, a 1850 elegy by Alfred, Lord Tennyson features the phrase in this passage; "Come: not in watches of the night, But where the sunbeam broodeth warm." Henry Wadsworth Longfellow wrote in The Cross of Snow (1879); "In the long, sleepless watches of the night. A gentle face. The face of one long dead. Looks at me from the wall". The 1883 novel Belinda by Rhoda Broughton has the passage; "How can she hurry the pace? she asks herself desperately, in the watches of the night".

== See also ==
- Witching hour
- Canonical hours
