= Kaskaskia College =

Community college in Centralia, Illinois, U.S.

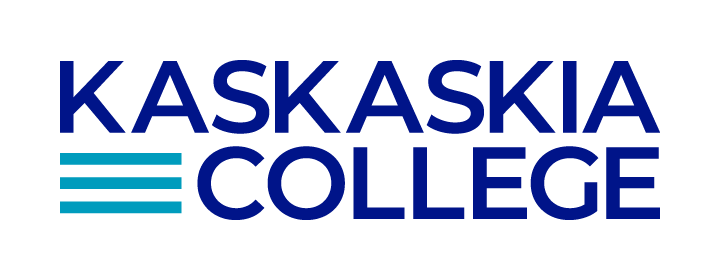
- Former names: Centralia Township Junior College (1940–1965); Centralia Junior College (?–1966)
- Motto: Success Starts Here!
- Type: Public community college
- Established: 1940; 86 years ago
- Endowment: $7,405,000
- President: George Evans
- Students: 3,370 (fall 2022)
- Location: Centralia, Illinois, U.S. 38°33′45″N 89°11′34″W
- Campus: 190 acres (77 ha); Rural
- Colors: Navy blue and white
- Nickname: Blue Devils/Blue Angels
- Sporting affiliations: NJCAA Division I Great Rivers Athletic Conference
- Website: kaskaskia.edu

Kaskaskia College is a public community college in Centralia, Illinois. Kaskaskia College's Community College District 501 serves all or part of nine counties, including Bond, Clinton, Fayette, Marion, Washington, Jefferson, St. Clair, Madison, and Montgomery.

== History ==
The college originated in 1940 as the first community college in the state established under the Junior College Act under the name "Centralia Township Junior College".

George Evans was appointed interim president of Kaskaskia College in November 2017 and officially became the institution's 11th president in June 2018. He has been affiliated with Kaskaskia College since 2008, holding a variety of positions, including adjunct faculty member, director of the Education Program at the Centralia Correctional Center, and dean of career and technical education.

In 2023, Evans was appointed by Illinois governor J.B. Pritzker to the Illinois Community College Board. He was confirmed in 2025.

The college's 9th president, Dr. James C. Underwood, died in early 2023.

== Academics ==
Kaskaskia College Associate of Arts and Associate of Science Degrees for students who wish to transfer to four-year colleges and universities. The college also offers 50 associate degree career programs and 102 certificates in occupational areas. The college has been accredited since 1964 and is accredited by the Higher Learning Commission.

== Campus ==
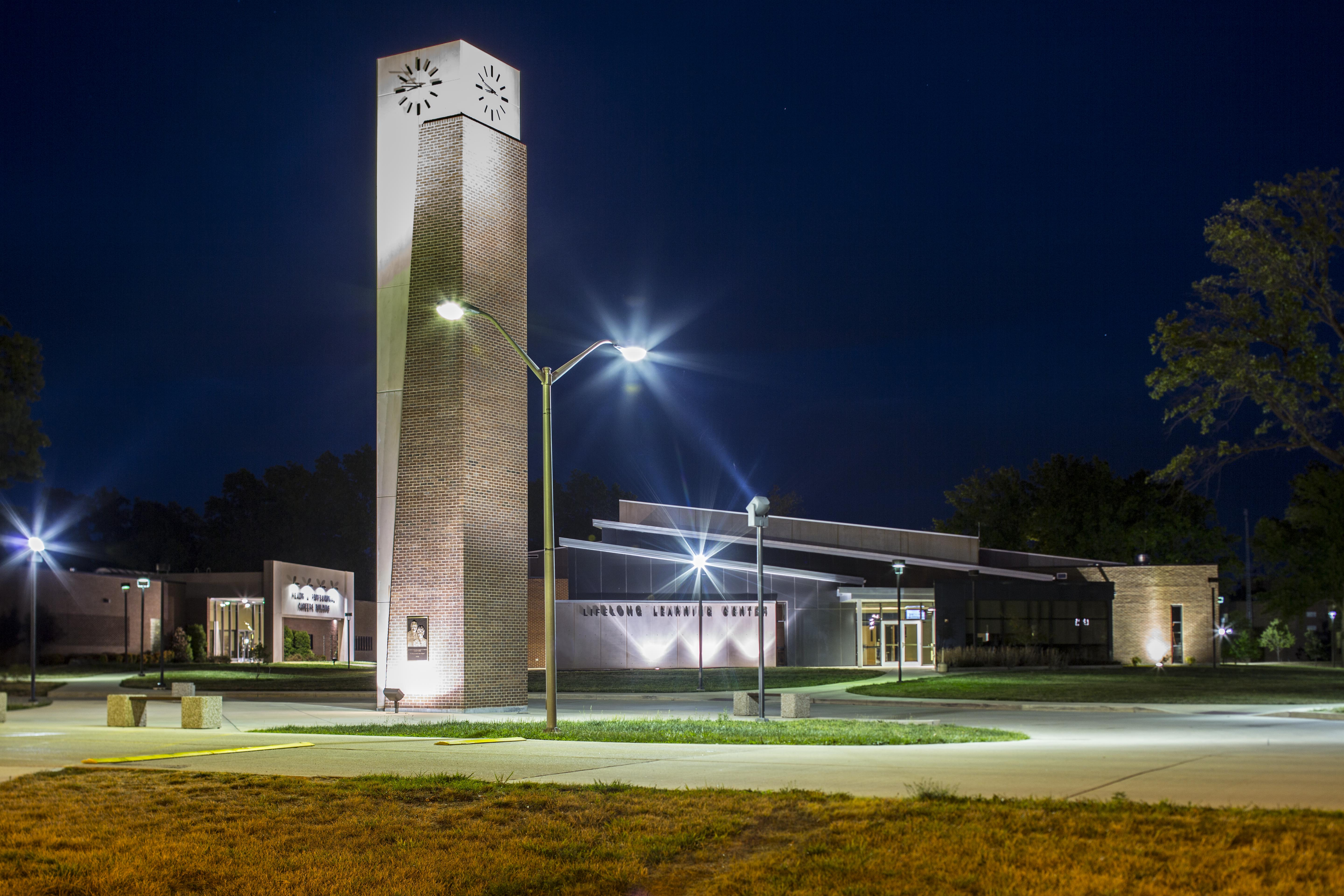
Lifelong Learning Center

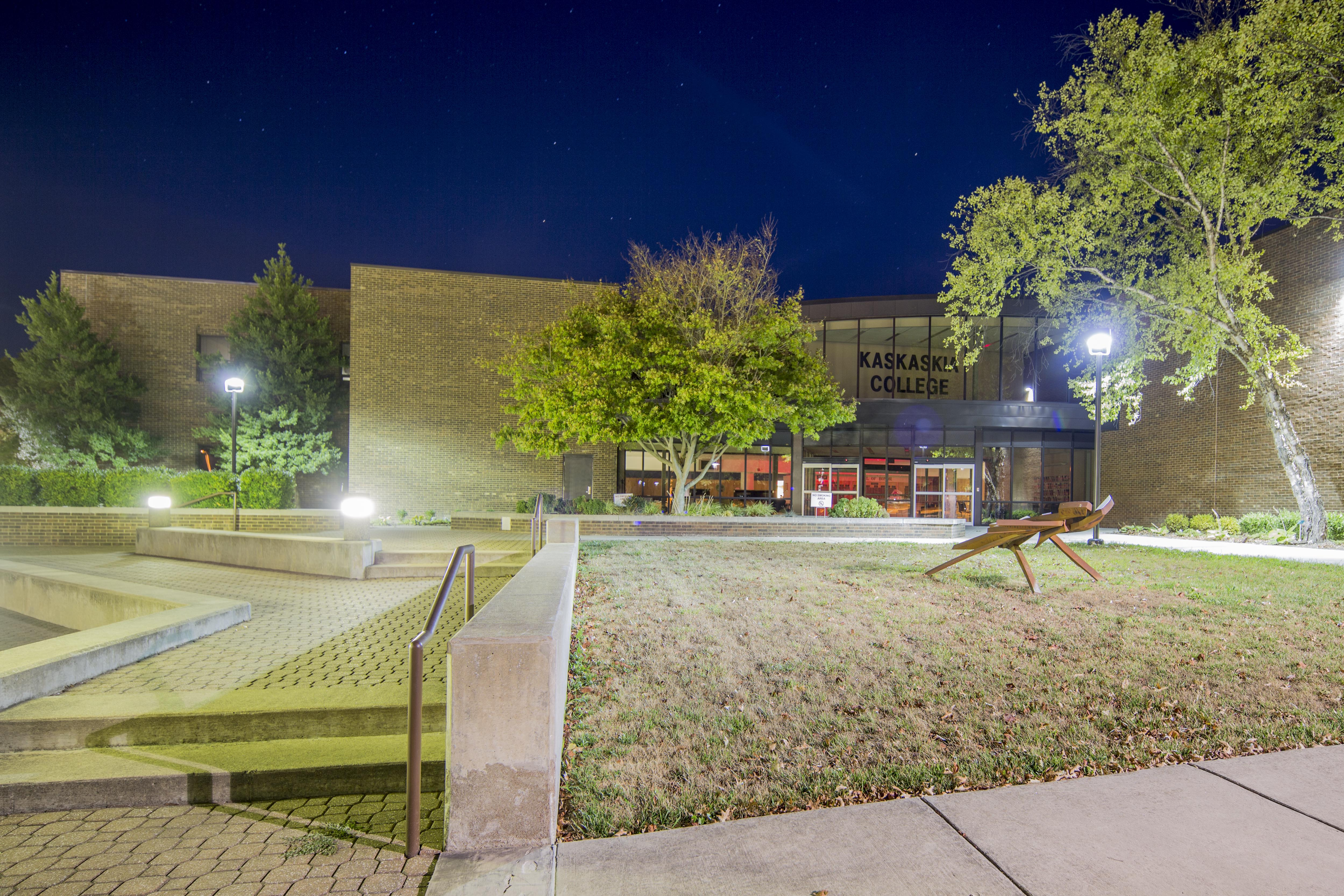
Main building

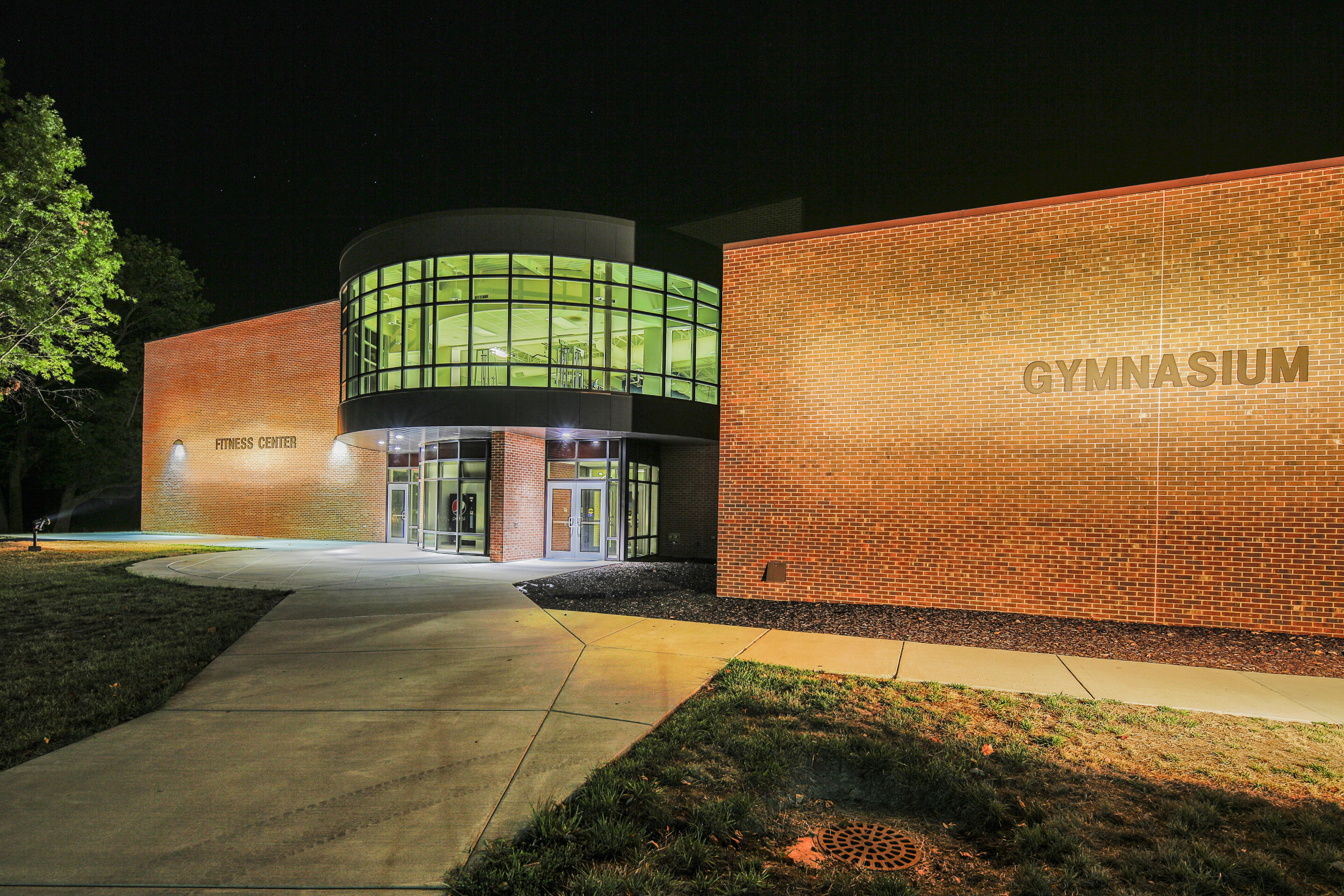
Fitness Center and Gym

Kaskaskia College's main campus is located on approximately 190 acres, three miles west of Centralia. The college has since constructed additional education centers in the communities of Vandalia, Salem, Greenville, Trenton, and Nashville. The college also houses its heavy occupation programs, Heating and Air Conditioning, Carpentry, Welding, and Industrial Technology at the Crisp Technology Center on Route 161 East in Centralia. In January 2025, the Crisp Technology Center was renamed to the Crisp Manufacturing and Trades Center.

=== Animal Disease Laboratory ===
In 2012, the state of Illinois closed the Centralia Animal Disease Laboratory as a cost-savings measure. In 2015, the Illinois House of Representatives passed a vote permitting the Illinois Department of Agriculture to sell the Animal Disease Lab to Kaskaskia College for one dollar. Illinois State Rep. John Cavaletto and Rep. Charlee Meier were the primary advocates for the state to transfer the building to the college. The former lab was added to campus as the Agricultural Building. In April 2024, Kaskaskia College voted to rename the building to the John D. Cavaletto Agricultural Center to honor John D. and Connie Cavaletto and their unwavering support for the college.

=== Campus improvements ===
In 2022, the college announced a multi-phase project aimed at modernizing its main campus, solidifying the college's infrastructure needs for the next 20-plus years. Improvements consisted of a $25 million renovation to modernize classrooms, a new innovative model to make the registration process more efficient and convenient, and upgraded spaces for the Auto Technology area.

=== Transportation ===
The main campus of Kaskaskia College is served by South Central Transit. The Cardinals Route and Purple Martin Route provide bus service to Centralia and other nearby communities.

== Athletics ==
The Kaskaskia athletic teams are known as the Blue Devils (for the men's teams) and the Blue Angels (for the women's teams). The college is a member of the NJCAA and a part of the Great Rivers Athletic Conference (GRAC), offering a number of sports.

Men's sports:

- Baseball
- Basketball
- Cross Country
- Tennis

In 2013, the baseball team qualified for the 2013 NJCAA Junior College World Series in Grand Junction, Colorado, for the first time in program history.

Women's sports:

- Basketball
- Cross Country
- Soccer
- Softball
- Tennis
- Volleyball

The softball team were the NJCAA Region XXIV Champions for 2023 and competed in the Softball World Series for the first time.
