= ImJayStation =

Canadian internet personality and YouTuber (born 1990)

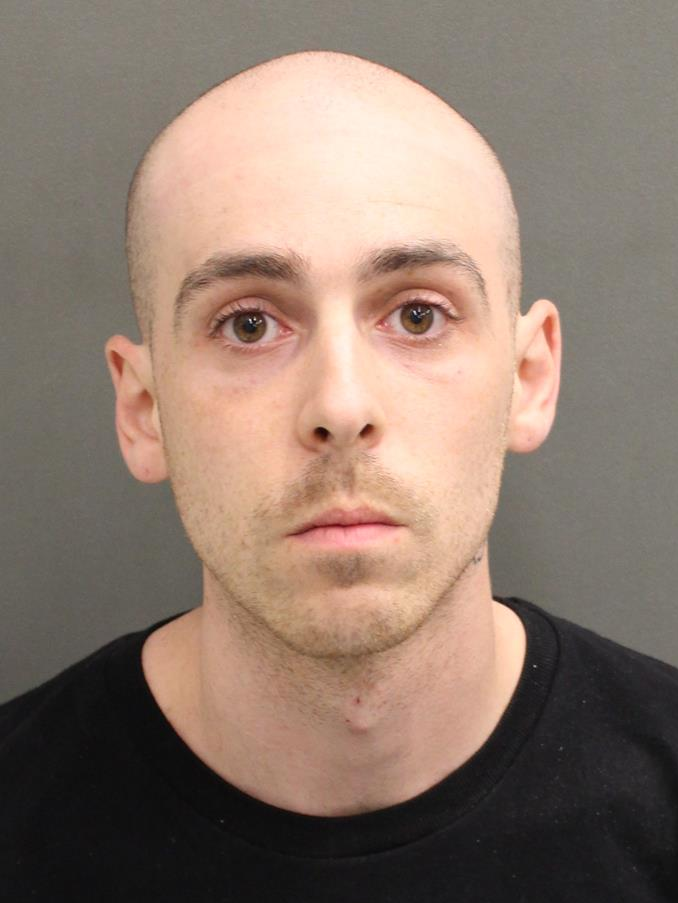
- Ethier in 2018
- Born: Jason Matthew Ethier; February 14, 1990 (age 36); Ottawa, Ontario, Canada
- Other names: JayStation, ImJayStation, 666, Station Studios
- Occupation: YouTuber

YouTube information
- Channel: Station Studios
- Years active: 2015–2021 (as ImJayStation) (Note: Went under a four-year hiatus following his channel termination until 2025.); 2025–present (as Station Studios)
- Genres: Comedy; Pranks
- Subscribers: 40 thousand
- Views: 1.3 million
- Last updated: January 25, 2026

Jason Matthew Ethier (born February 14, 1990), better known as ImJayStation or JayStation, is a Canadian Internet personality and YouTuber, noted for controversial content produced between 2015 until 2021. He is primarily well known for his "3 AM challenges", a subgenre of prank videos which are stylized parodies of paranormal reality TV shows. He is also known for his Ouija board videos, fake creepypasta calls, and unboxing videos, among others.

== Biography ==
=== Arrests for trespassing and YouTube growth ===
Ethier began his YouTube channel in 2015 as JayStation, showcasing controversial content that included him allegedly breaking and entering into empty homes, stadiums and office buildings overnight (although some instances of these were later revealed to have been staged). In 2016, Jason was arrested by Ottawa police for trespassing as evidenced by the videos he posted, which led to demonetization of his YouTube channel. He returned as "ImJayStation" in late 2016, reuploading most content except material tied to his trespassing charges.

In 2018, approaching 2 million YouTube subscribers, Jason was arrested at Florida's Walt Disney World and was charged with trespassing and resisting arrest. He later called for a boycott of Walt Disney World and threatened legal action.

=== Attempt to contact deceased celebrities ===
In 2019, Jason attracted controversy once more due to a series of videos in which he attempted to contact deceased celebrities through paranormal means (notably Ouija and "spirit boxes") at 3:00 am. He received a particularly negative response to a video wherein Jason apologized for capitalizing on the deaths of well-known figures and criticized other internet personalities for doing the same, despite this message being contradicted by the clickbait title of the same posted video, referencing the recent suicide of YouTuber Etika.

=== Death hoaxes, YouTube ban, and return ===
In January 2020, Jason announced his girlfriend, fellow YouTuber Alexia Marano, had been killed by a drunk driver. Later content showed him visiting a memorial and attempting to contact her through Ouija. Following an investigation however, it was revealed that this was a publicity stunt to gain subscribers, that Alexia was alive and well, and that Jason was intending to "resurrect" her in a later video. In an article by BBC News, they described Jason's actions as a "death hoax". Alexia separated from Jason and deleted her own YouTube channel, with a warrant for Jason's arrest being issued by Toronto Police due to allegations of abuse against her.

Later in 2020, Jason and Alexia returned to YouTube on a joint channel known as Dream Team,. However, the channel's content was removed following a second separation. The channel was subsequently restructured with the new name "666", containing only Jason producing reaction content.

Jay went under a 4-year hiatus from his channel termination in 2021 until October 2025, when YouTube launched a "Second Chance" program, allowing banned creators to return from scratch under strict conditions. Jay returned under the channel "TheScariest" where he made cryptid narrations, until rebranding his channel to "Station Studios" where he returned to making his classic 3 AM challenges and paranormal-related content.

Jason created another Youtube channel under "Pleiadian Canadian" on August 2026, focusing on far-right political commentary and reaction to videos involving immigrants in Canada.
