= Bonde (surname) =

Bonde is a surname of Swedish origin.

It is often associated with the medieval House of Bonde.

Notable people with the surname also include:

- Alexander Bonde (born 1975), German politician
- Arne Bonde (editor) (1924–2003), Norwegian media executive
- Bill Bonde (born 1934), Australian politician
- Emmanuel Bonde (1947–2025), Cameroonian politician
- James Bonde, 16th-century Anglican priest
- Jens-Peter Bonde (1948–2021), Danish politician
- Line Bonde (born c. 1979), Danish fighter pilot
- Nanna Bonde (born 1993), Danish politician
- Oskar Bonde (born 1979), Swedish drummer
- Christoffer Bonde (born 1999), Danish handball player
- William Bonde (died 1530), Bridgettine monk
