= Falsework =

Temporary structure to support permanent structure during construction

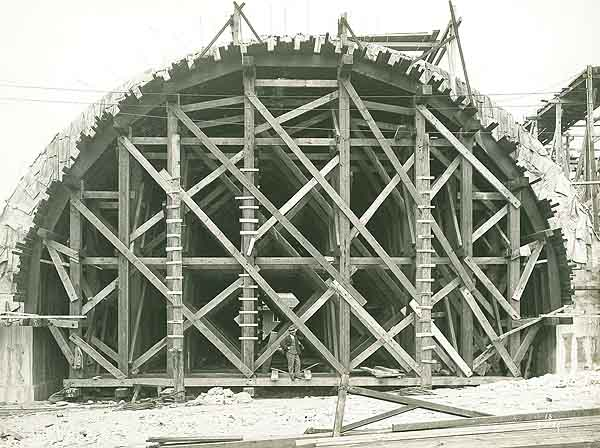
Arch ring and falsework, 1932

Falsework consists of temporary structures used in construction to support a permanent structure until its construction is sufficiently advanced to support itself. For arches, this is specifically called centering. Falsework includes temporary support structures for formwork used to mold concrete in the construction of buildings, bridges, and elevated roadways.

The British Standards of practice for falsework, BS 5975:2008, defines falsework as "Any temporary structure used to support a permanent structure while it is not self-supporting."

== History ==
Workflow on the Roman Limyra Bridge in Turkey: the falsework was moved to another opening as soon as the lower arch rib had been completed

Falsework has been employed in bridge and viaduct construction since ancient times. The Romans were renowned for its use, as at the Limyra Bridge in Turkey. Until the turn of the 20th century almost all falsework was constructed from timber. To compensate for timber shortages in different regions and to rationalize labor and material usage, new systems were developed.

The major developments include the design of connection devices (coupler), transitions to other spanning beams such as steel pipes or profiles or reusable timber beams, and adjustable steel props. In 1935 W.A. de Vigier designed an adjustable steel prop which revolutionized many aspects of the construction industry including to support slab formwork, wall formwork, trench sheeting and falsework. Materials from which falsework systems are manufactured have also diversified from traditional steel and timber to aluminium components.

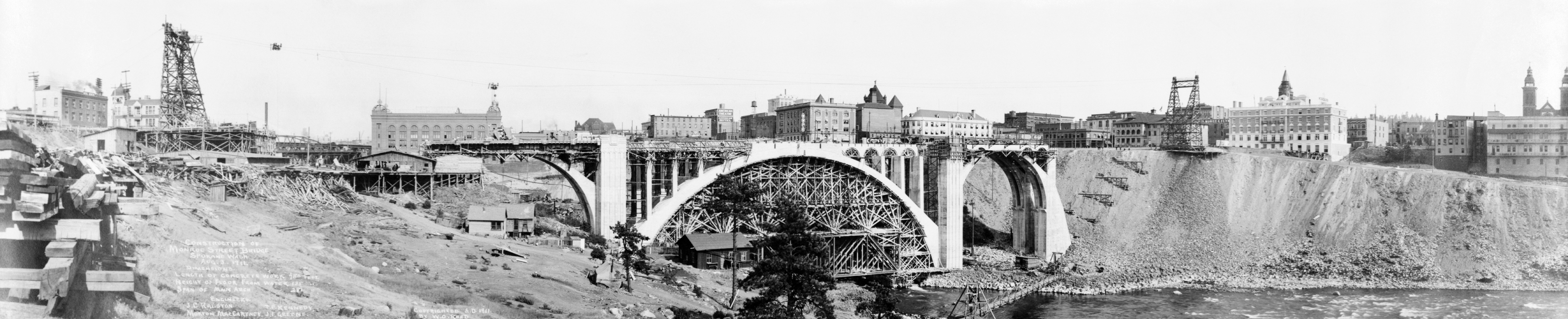
Falsework centering in the center arch of Monroe Street Bridge, Spokane, Washington, 1911

In the UK, BS 5975 gives recommendations for the design and use of falsework on construction sites. It was first introduced by the British Standards Institute in March 1982 and the third version was published in 2008 with Amendment 1 in 2011. The new revisions bring the code up to date with methodology developed in the new CDM 2007 regulations and also the requirements of the new European codes EN 12811-1:2003 Temporary works equipment - Part 1: scaffolds, and EN 12812:2004, falsework - performance requirements and general design.

== In modern roadway construction ==
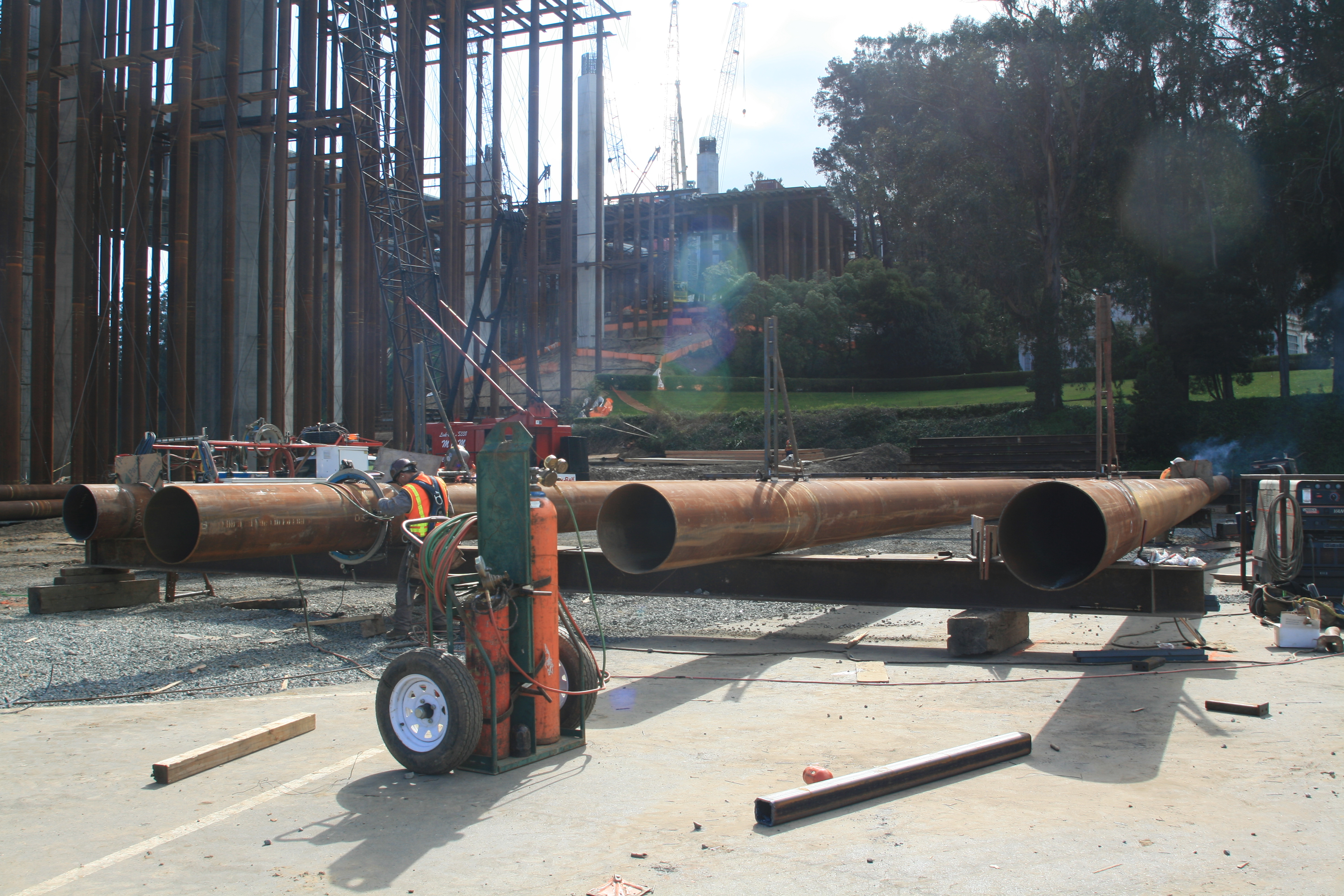
Fabrication

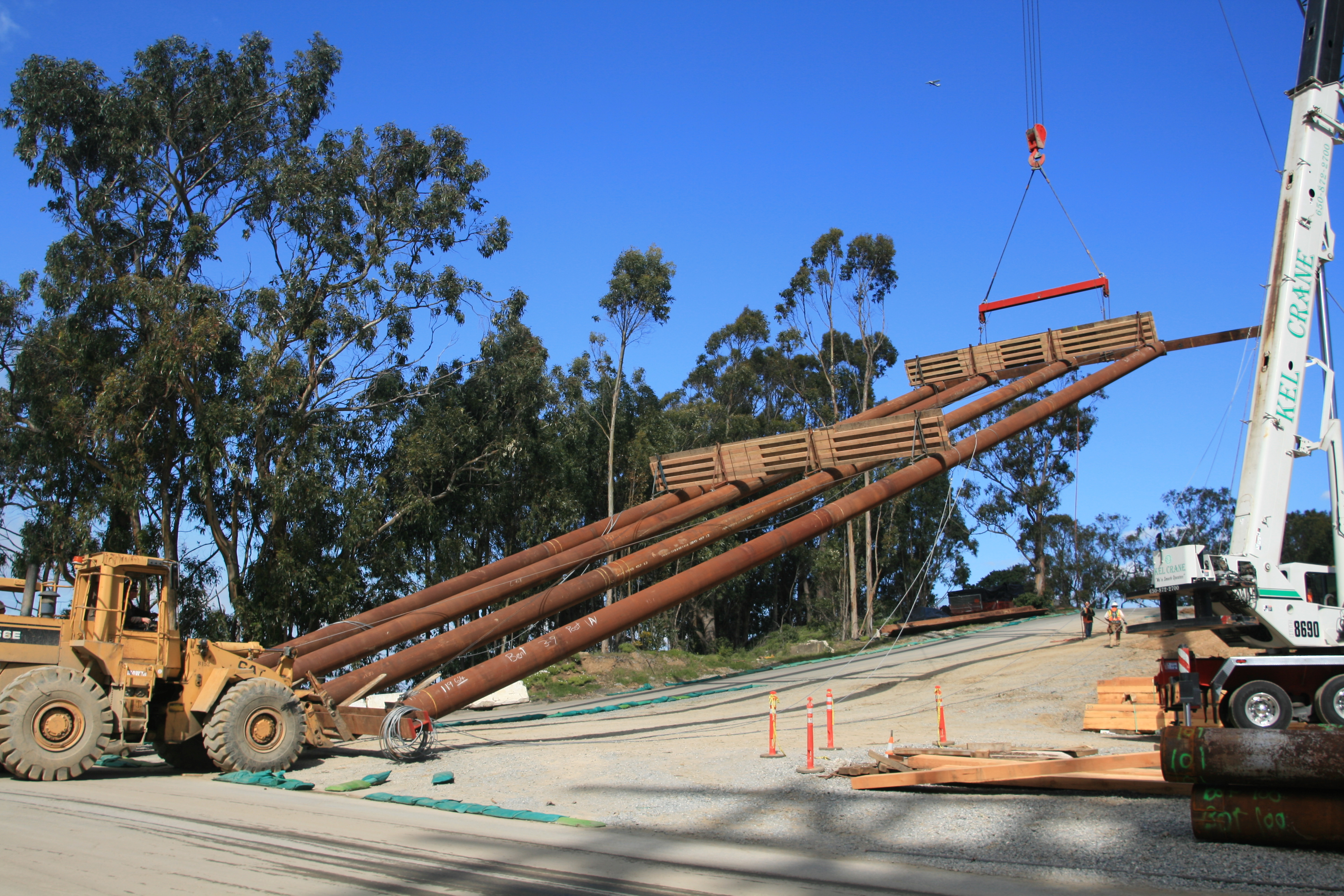
Erection

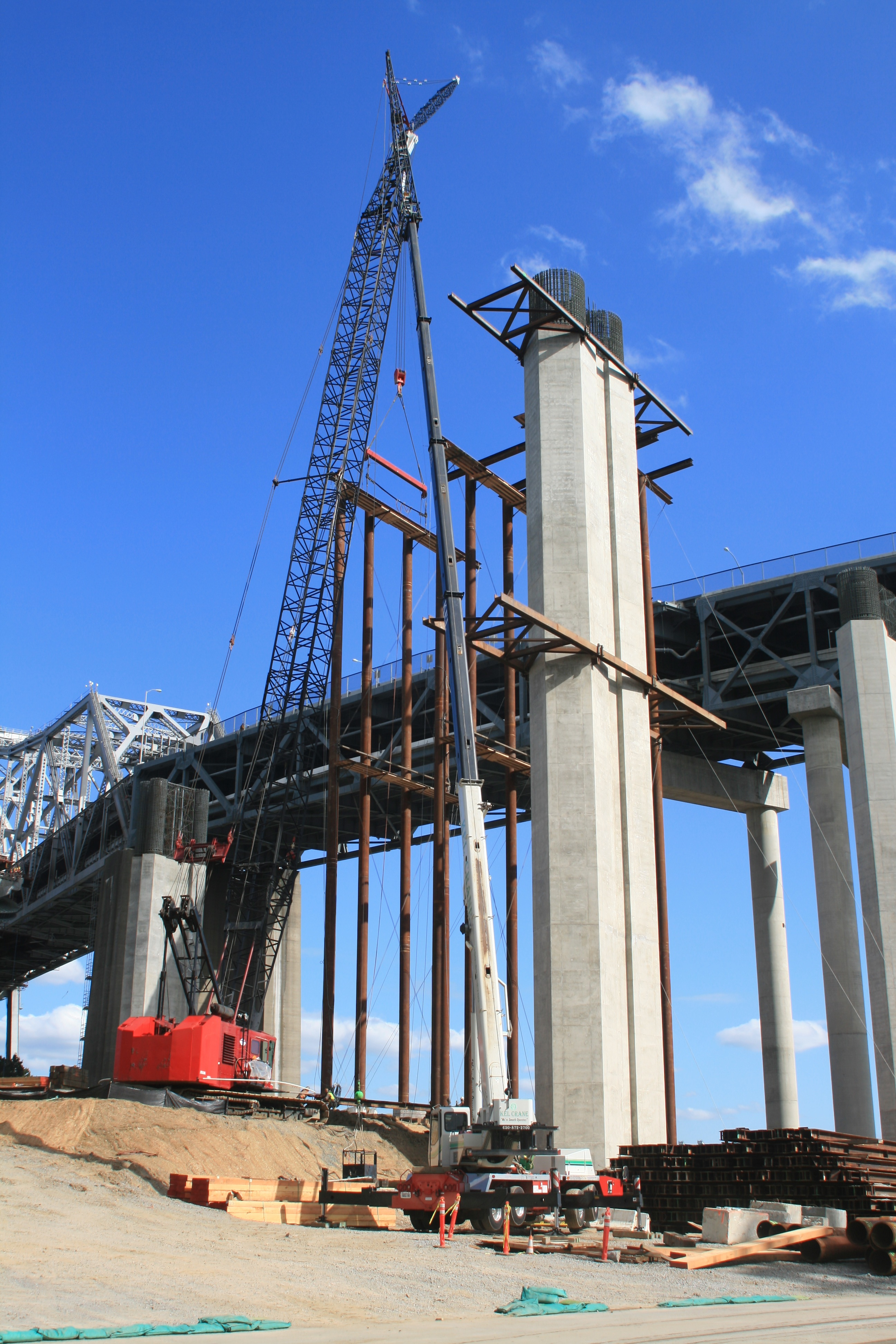
Placement

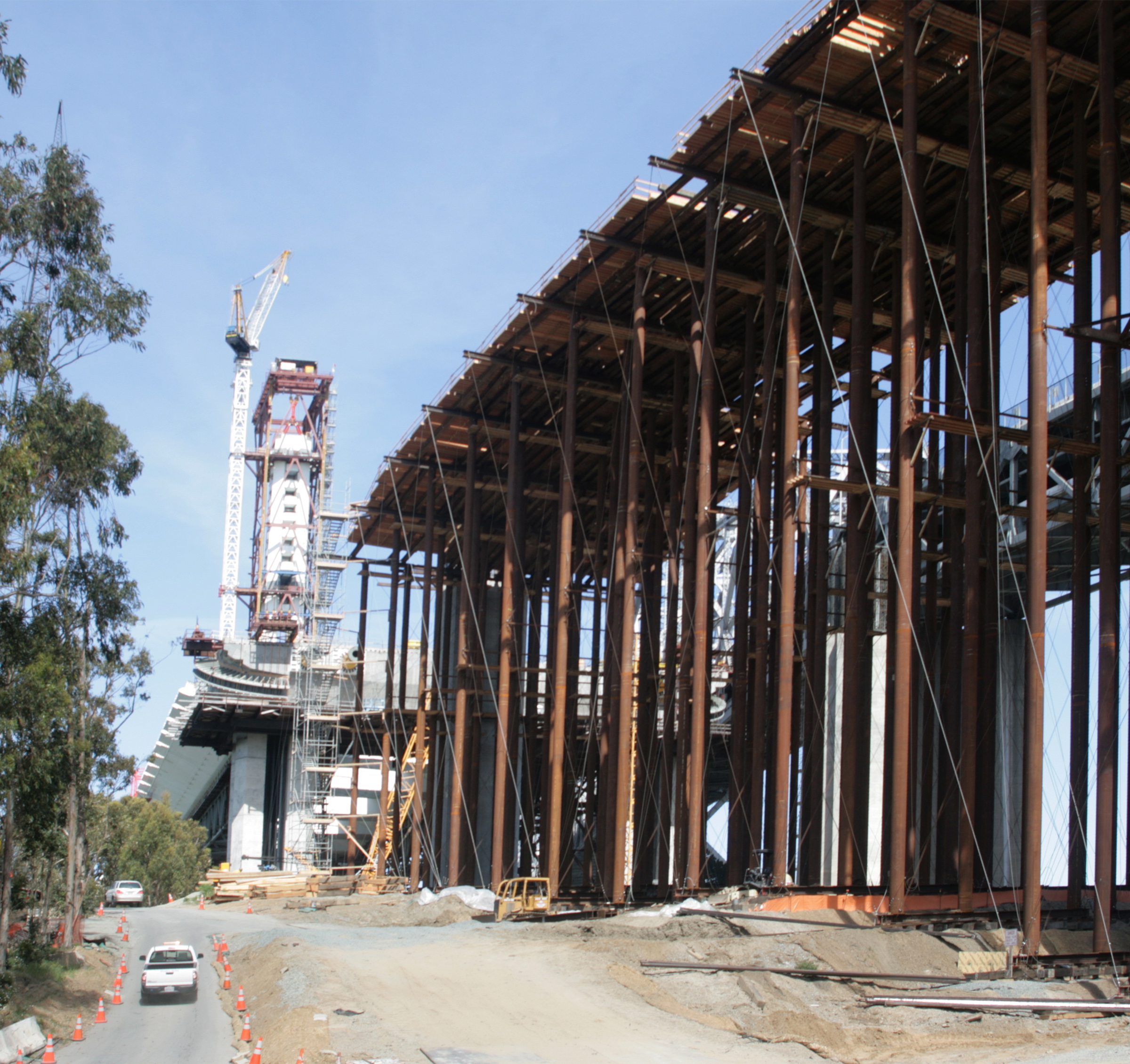
Completed falsework

In this example of pipe-column falsework for a post-tensioned reinforced concrete flyover connector for the eastern span replacement of the San Francisco-Oakland Bay Bridge, metalworkers fabricated falsework sections from pipe and beams. A section was then lifted to a vertical position with the assistance of heavy equipment, and guided into position by a ground crew. Decking was then placed on the falsework, followed by formwork.

When the supports were complete, wood beams and plywood or reusable metal forms were placed, reinforcing and tenon conduits added, and concrete poured. After curing and tenon tensioning, wedges were removed and forms and the falsework was disassembled.

== In bridge construction ==
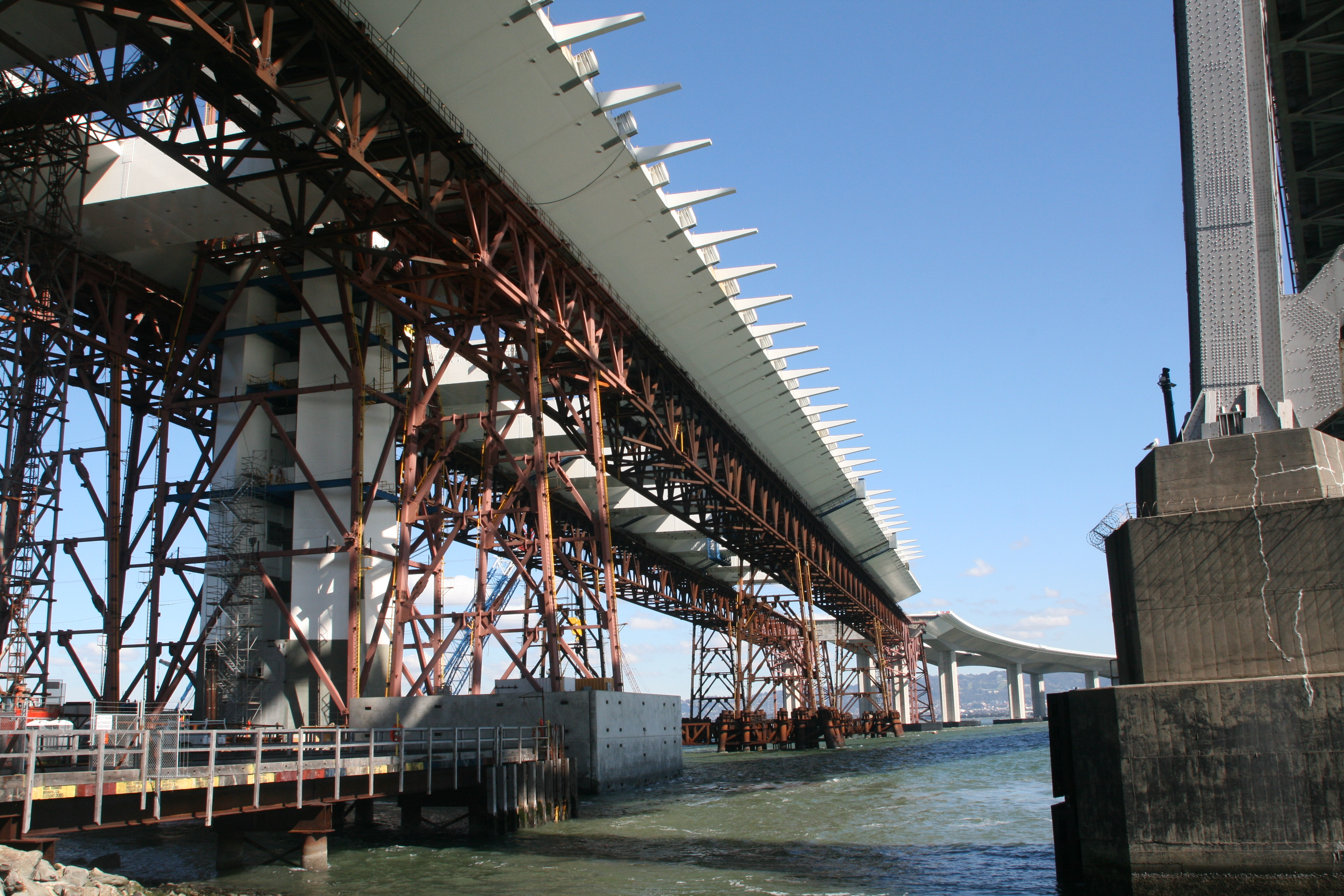
Falsework parallel truss bridges temporarily supporting deck segment box structures

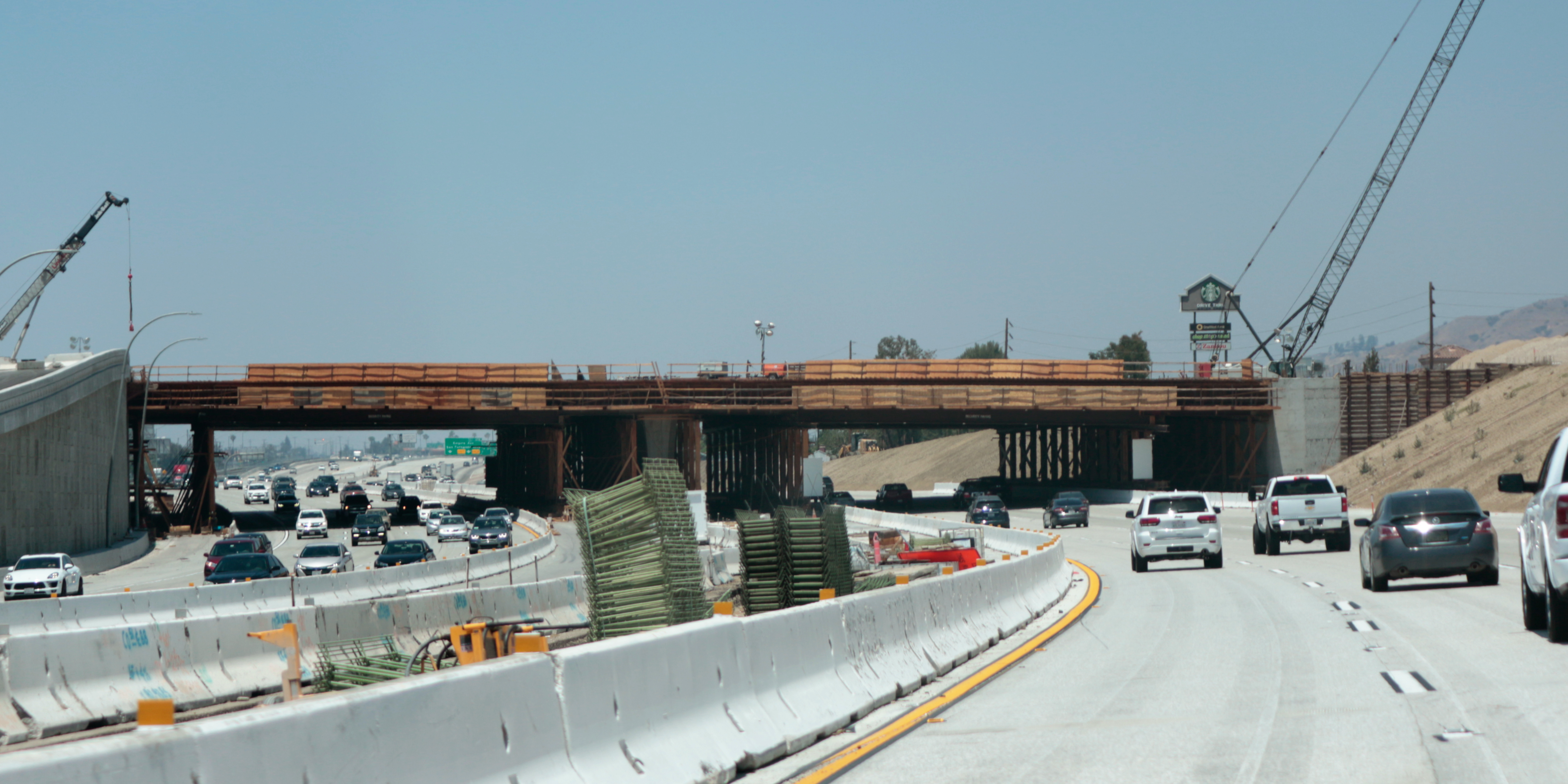
Overpass under construction over Interstate 5 in Burbank, California, in July 2021

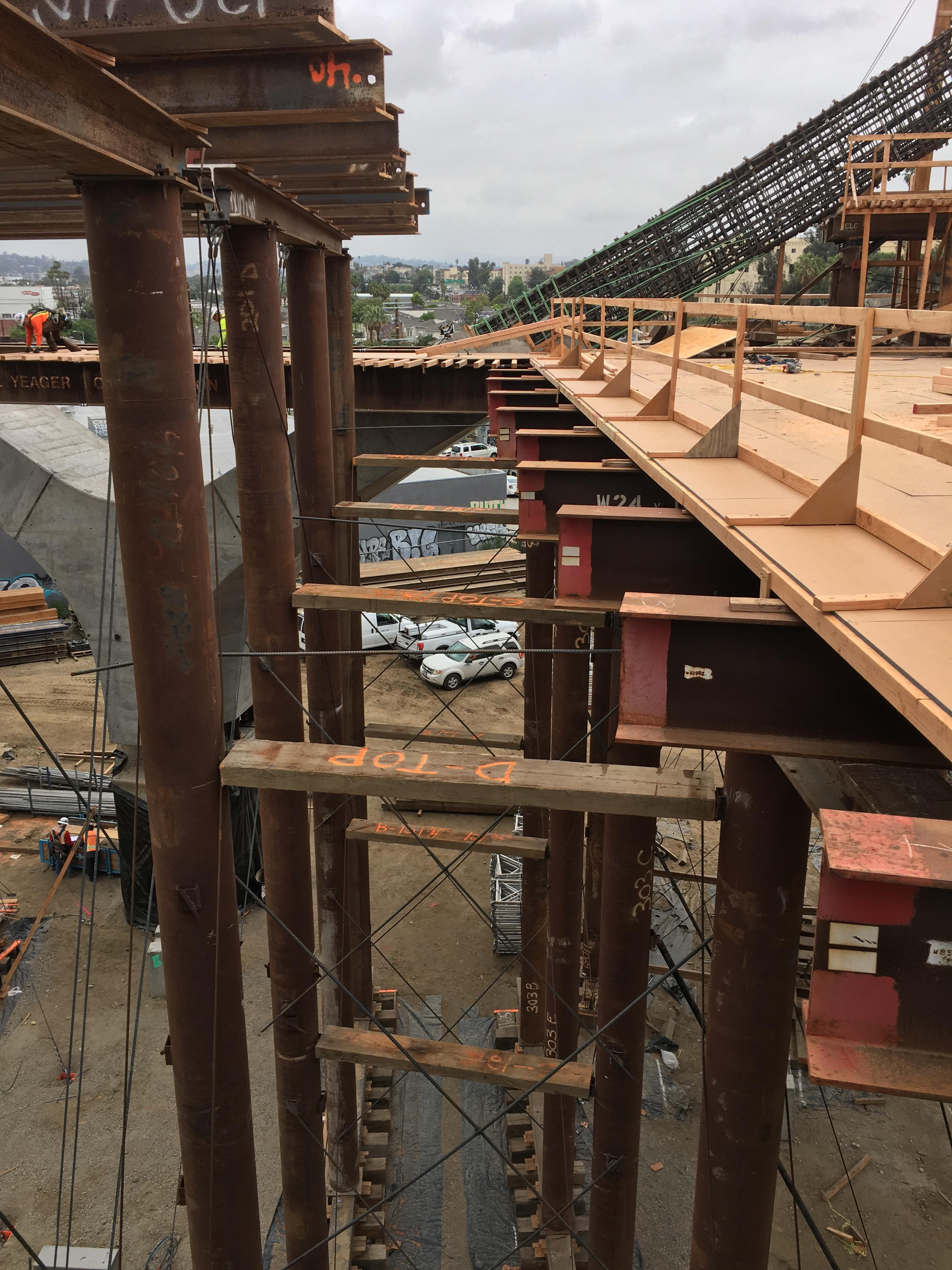
Sixth Street Viaduct falsework in downtown Los Angeles. Shown in the background is a concrete Y-arm.

A certain type of bridge, the self-anchored suspension bridge, must be supported during construction, either by the use of cantilever or suspension methods or by support from below. Support from below was used in the construction of the main span of the eastern span replacement of the San Francisco–Oakland Bay Bridge, using parallel prefabricated truss spans.

Cast in place concrete bridges must also be supported during construction. The new Sixth Street Viaduct in Los Angeles, California, was cast on falsework and then hung on its network tied arch cables. The release of the falsework coincided with the tensioning of the arch cables.

=== Typical falsework components ===
Soffit: 5/8" or ¾" form plywood laid over 4×4 or 4×6 joists spaced 6 to 16 inches on center, forming the bottom face of the deck against which the concrete is poured

Camber: wood strips (camber strips) added to a load-supporting beam or stringer to compensate for its anticipated deflection, so the completed structure has its intended line and grade

Stringer: horizontal member spanning between falsework bents that distributes joist loads to the top caps; also called a beam

Top cap: horizontal member in the falsework bent that distributes stringer loads to the posts

Post: timber or steel member whose primary purpose is to carry axial load from the top cap to the bottom cap, corbel, or pad

Bottom cap: horizontal member in the falsework bent that distributes post loads to the corbels or pads, typically through wedges and sand jacks

Wedge pack: wedges used to allow adjustments when the falsework must be reshored

Corbel: short beam used to distribute the post load across the top of the pad(s)

Pad: timber or concrete members used to distribute the corbel loads or post loads to the soil

== See also ==
- Arch bridge for the use of falsework in bridge construction.
- List of construction methods
