= Bonde =

Bonde may refer to:

- House of Bonde, medieval Swedish nobility
- Bonde (surname), includes a list of people with the name
- Bonde ('farmer'), a member of one of the four estates of the Swedish Riksdag of the Estates, or, rhetorically, the estate itself
- Bondé, a village in Burkina Faso
- Bonde ('tramway'), any of the old Brazilian trams, such as the Rio de Janeiro's Santa Teresa Tram

== See also ==
- Boondi, an Indian dessert
