= Col. William M. and Nancy Ralston Bond House =

Historic house in New York, United States

- U.S. National Register of Historic Places
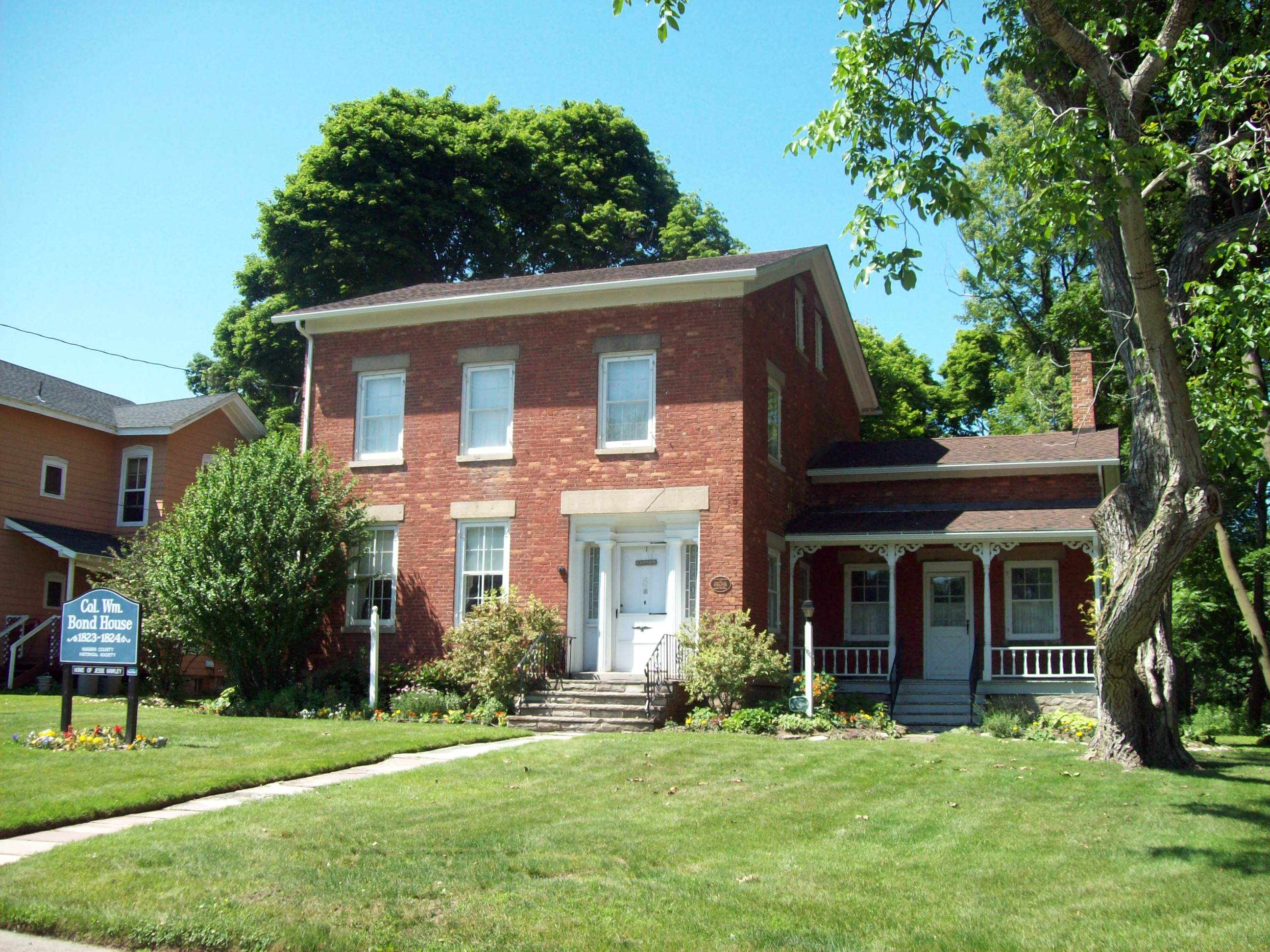
- Col. William M. and Nancy Ralston Bond House, June 2009

- Location within New York Location within the United States
- Interactive map showing the location of William and Nancy Ralston Bond House
- Location: 143 Ontario St., Lockport, New York
- Coordinates: 43°10′16″N 78°41′56″W
- Built: 1823
- Architectural style: Mid 19th Century Revival, Early Republic
- NRHP reference No.: 95000529
- Added to NRHP: April 20, 1995

Col. William M. and Nancy Ralston Bond House is a historic home in Lockport in Niagara County, New York. It is a 2-story brick structure, with a 1 1/2-story side wing, constructed in 1823 in the late Federal / early Greek Revival style. The Niagara County Historical Society operates it as a house museum.

It was listed on the National Register of Historic Places in 1995.
