= Bonding (novel) =

2024 novel by Mariel Franklin

- Author: Mariel Franklin
- Language: English
- Publisher: FSG
- Publication date: 2024
- Publication place: United Kingdom
- ISBN: 978-0-3746-1960-2

Bonding is a debut novel by British writer Mariel Franklin, published in 2024. It is a social satire set in London and Ibiza, exploring relationships, technology, and mental health in the modern world.

== Plot ==
The story follows Mary, a woman in her 30s living in London. She feels lost in her career and relationships. After losing her job, she travels to Ibiza, where she meets Tom, a scientist developing a new drug called Eudaxa, meant to treat depression and anxiety.

When Mary returns to London, she reconnects with Lara, her ex-girlfriend, who now runs a dating app called Openr. Mary begins working with Lara, creating content for the app. As the story goes on, Mary finds herself caught between Tom's pharmaceutical dreams and Lara's tech ambitions, while trying to understand what love and connection mean in a world driven by data and self-promotion.

== Reception ==
The book has been well received by critics, and praised on its perspective on life in the digital age. Rob Doyle from The Guardian called it "smart and fun," and praised its satire of tech culture. Johanna Thomas-Corr from The Times described it as "a 19th-century novel of manners for the age of dating apps and psychedelic therapy."

== Author ==
Mariel Franklin is the author of Bonding. She is a writer and novelist based in London.
