= Lloyd–Bond House =

Historic house in Florida, United States

- U.S. National Register of Historic Places
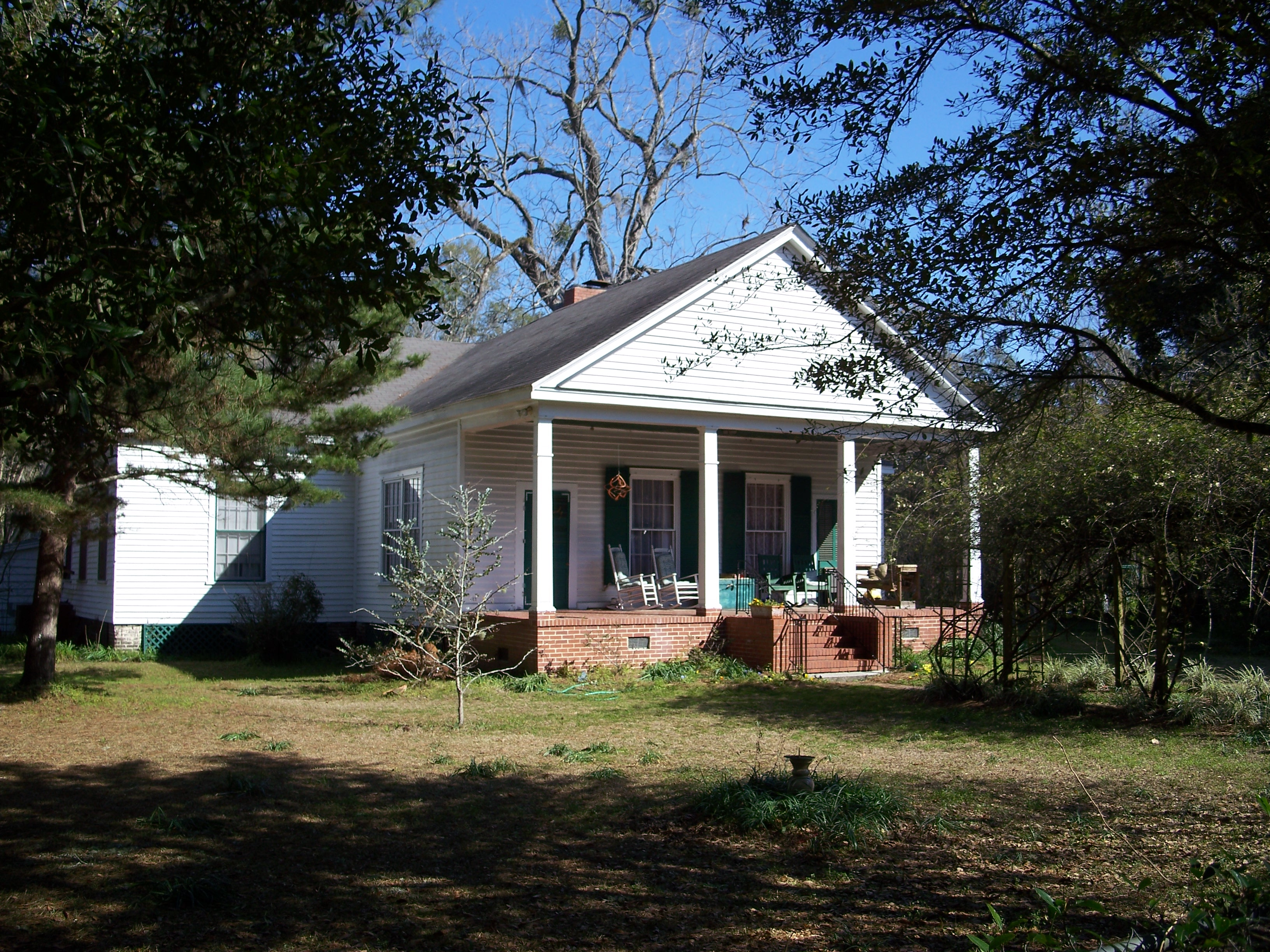

- Location within Florida Location within the United States
- Location: Lloyd, Florida
- Coordinates: 30°28′41″N 84°1′24″W
- Built: c. 1864
- Architectural style: Frame Vernacular with Classical Revival elements
- NRHP reference No.: 84000198
- Added to NRHP: November 1, 1984

The Lloyd–Bond House (also known as the Miller House) is a historic home in Lloyd, Florida. It is located on Bond Street. On November 1, 1984, it was added to the U.S. National Register of Historic Places.

== Gallery ==
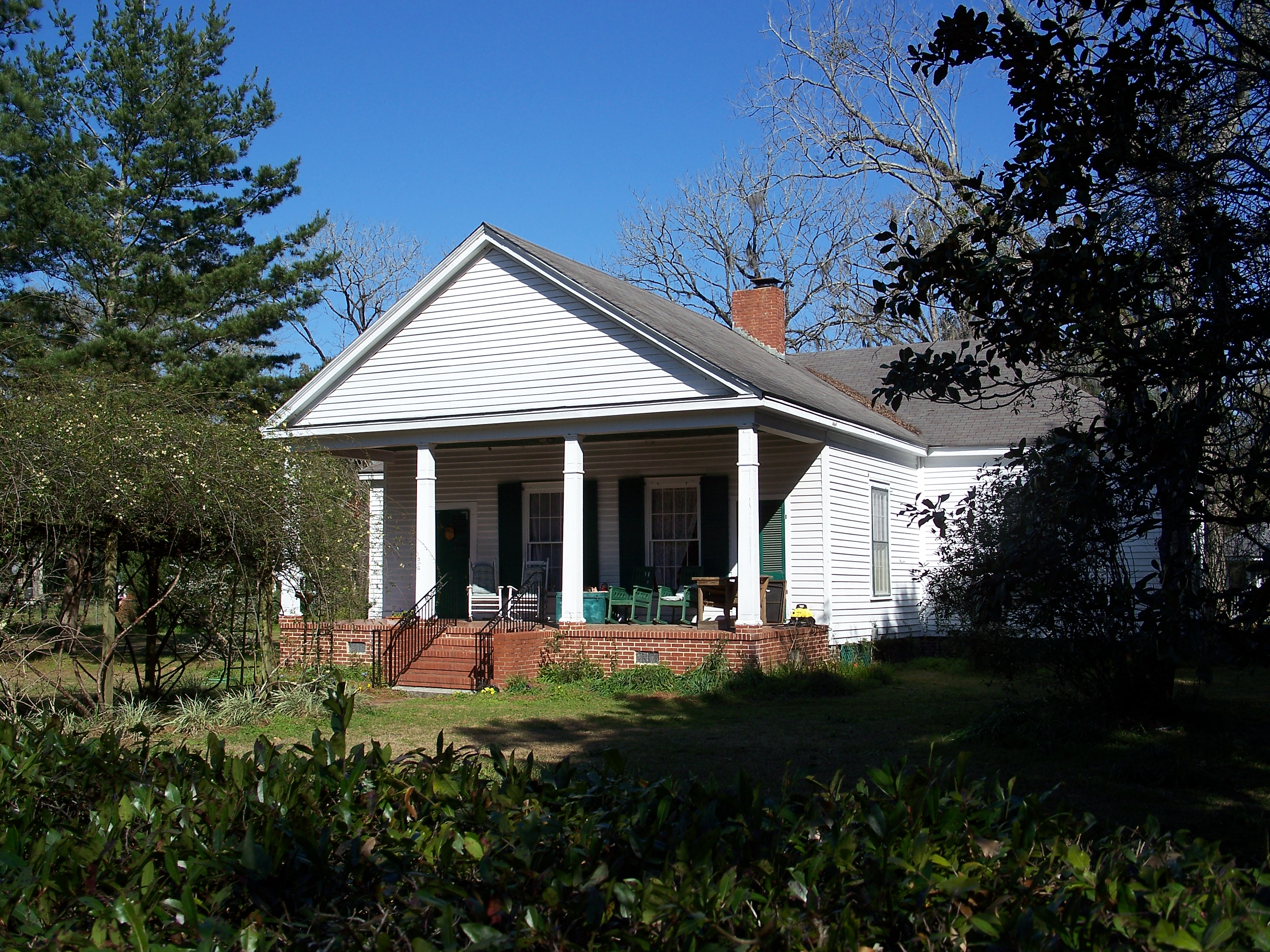

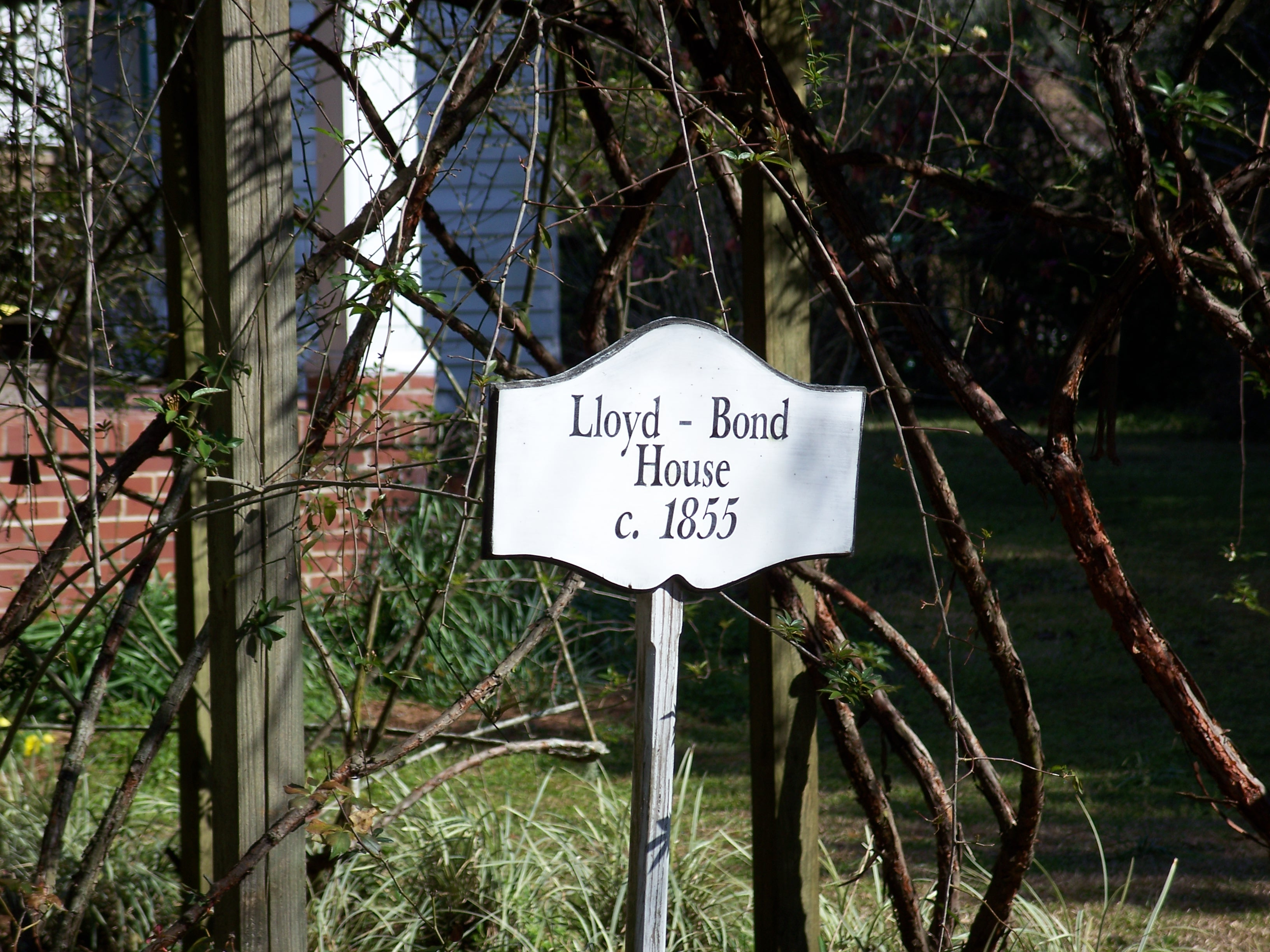
Marker
