= Bond South Africa =

Bond South Africa was a campus of Bond University Australia, located in Sandton, Gauteng, South Africa.

The campus closed in 2004, after successfully implementing distance studies in the early 90's, extending to SADC countries. Bond South Africa previously had been accredited to offer Undergraduate and Master of Business Administration (MBA) degrees.

Distance learning was implemented after successfully establishing learning centers in countries such as Zambia, Namibia and Southern Botswana. Students who have previously applied at our campus in Sandton, were offered the opportunity to complete their studies in their home countries.

Bond SA and nine other business schools had their MBA programs dis-accredited by the Council of Higher Education (CHE), for failing to meet minimum standards.

A spokesperson for the chairperson of the Council of Higher Education stated briefly that Bond SA did not meet the new criteria put in place, stating that the MBA programs would need to be phased out and applications for re-accreditation could commence after two years. He went on to state that previous certifications, diplomas and degrees obtained, would remain accredited as per previous set standards.

Bond SA's owners criticized the criteria, citing that the review focused on the process of application rather than the effectiveness of the studies which lead to the graduation outcomes.

Bond University Australia's vice chancellor expressed disappointment at the outcome.

"The council's decision would only add to the lack of access that African universities have to high-quality foreign expertise and learning practices. All Bond qualifications are highly appraised by foreign countries and we had hoped to pave a path forward for African students seeking professional private education. This will not affect qualifications earned by the thousands of students which have completed campus and distance learning programs. (Bond Australia) is not prepared to compromise the quality of its internationally recognized diplomas and degrees, to conform with process issues in one country of the world."
