= Emmanuel Bonde =

Cameroonian politician (1947–2025)

Member of the Constitutional Council
- In office 7 February 2018 – 3 January 2025

Minister of Mines, Industry and Technological Development
- In office 9 December 2011 – 1 October 2015

Minister of the Public Service and Administrative Reform
- In office 2006–2011
- Preceded by: Benjamin Amana
- Succeeded by: Ange Michel Angouin

Personal details
- Born: 14 January 1947 Batouri, French Cameroon
- Died: 3 January 2025 (aged 77)
- Party: CPDM
- Education: École normale supérieure de Yaoundé
- Occupation: Schoolteacher

Emmanuel Bonde (14 January 1947 – 3 January 2025) was a Cameroonian politician of the Cameroon People's Democratic Movement (CPDM).

== Life and career ==
Born in Batouri, Bonde studied at the École normale supérieure de Yaoundé and became a schoolteacher. He was then appointed attaché to the president's economic and social council, where he remained until 1978. He then worked as a secretary of state to the Ministry of Public Health, then to the Ministry of Scientific and Technical Research, and lastly to the Ministry of Public Works.

In 2006, Bonde was appointed Minister of the Public Service and Administrative Reform, where he servedfruntil 2011. That year, he was appointed Minister of Mines, Industry and Technological Development, a position he held until 2015. A longtime member of the CPDM, he resigned from the party upon his appointment to the Constitutional Council in 2018.

Bonde died in 2025, at the age of 77.

== Distinctions ==
- Knight of the Order of Merit
- Grand Officer of the Order of Valour (2007)
