= Bonds (surname) =

Bonds is an English surname. Notable people with the surname include:

- Alfred Bryan Bonds (1913–1989), American public servant, college administrator and fifth president of Baldwin-Wallace College
- Anita Bonds (born 1945), American Democratic politician
- Barry Bonds (born 1964), American former Major League Baseball player
- Bill Bonds (1932–2014), American television anchor and reporter
- Billy Bonds (1946–2025), British footballer and manager
- Bobby Bonds (1946–2003), American Major League Baseball player, father of Barry Bonds and Bobby Bonds Jr.
- Bobby Bonds Jr. (born 1970), American former Minor League Baseball player, brother of Barry Bonds
- De'Aundre Bonds (born 1976), American actor
- Gary U.S. Bonds (born 1939), American rhythm and blues and rock 'n' roll singer
- Jeanne Milliken Bonds (born 1962), American politician
- Jeff Bonds (born 1982), American professional basketball player for the Gießen 46ers
- John Bonds (born 1970), American football player
- Julia Bonds (1952–2011), anti-coal mining activist, director of CRMW
- Margaret Bonds (1913–1972), American composer and pianist
- Parris Afton Bonds, American novelist
- Rosie Bonds (born 1944), winner of 1964 Summer Olympics 80 meter hurdle, sister of Bobby Bonds
- Terrell Bonds (born 1994), American football player
