= Bond Nunatak =

Nunatak in Graham Land, Antarctica

Bond Nunatak (67°9′S 68°10′W) is a snow-capped nunatak with rock exposures on its west face, rising north of Mount Bouvier on Adelaide Island. It was named by the UK Antarctic Place-Names Committee in 1963 for Flight Lieutenant Peter R. Bond, RAF, pilot with the British Antarctic Survey Aviation Unit based at Adelaide station in 1962–63.
