= Kalyani Bondre =

Indian singer

- Born: November 1, 1981 (age 44); Pune, India
- Occupation: vocalist

Kalyani Bondre (born 1981) is an academic (Economist), Indian classical vocalist and Kathak Dancer.

== Early life ==
Kalyani Bondre (Marathi: कल्याणी बोन्द्रे) was born in Pune, India, into a musical family. She received initial guidance in music from her parents, both musicians in their own right. As a child, Kalyani was more interested in classical dance and hence took lessons in Kathak dance from Guru Maneesha Sathe, disciple of the famous Pandit Gopi Krishna.

Kalyani trained in vocal classical music earlier under Ranjana Bhide, disciple of Pandit Gangadharbuwa Pimpalkhare. Later, she learned from Guru Manisha Shrikhande, who is a disciple of Leelatai and Vilasrao Khandekar of the Kirana Gharana; and Pandit Krishnakant Parikh and Dr. Shobha Abhyankar of the Mewati Gharana(both disciples of Padmavibhushan Sangeet Martand Pandit Jasraj). Kalyani has also received guidance in music from Ustad Faiyaaz Hussain Khan of the Gwalior Gharana and Ustad Usman Khan of the Beenkar Gharana of instrumental music.

== Education ==
Bondre holds a Ph.D. in Economics from the University of Pune and Master's degrees in both Economics, and Human Resource Management, and is a member of management department from Jaipur.

== Repertoire ==
Kalyani specializes in Hindustani Classical Music and Marathi Natyasangeet^{(1)}. She also presents other forms like Bhaavgeet, ghazals, devotional music like bhajans and abhangas as well as fusion music.^{(2)} ^{(3)}

== Recognition ==
Kalyani Bondre was honoured by the Pune Municipal Corporation for her contribution to Indian Classical Music at the hands of the then Mayor of Pune, Mr. Dattatreya Dhankawade in the presence of the Municipal Commissioner of Pune, Mr. Kunal Kumar on India's Republic Day on 26 January 2016. ^{(4)} She received the Phoenix Leading Lady Award 2018 at the hands of actress Tabu ^{(5)} and was awarded at an International Song Contest organised by Graduate Women International in 2019 ^{(6)} and Pioneering Woman Leader Award in 2020 at the World Women's Congress in Mumbai
