= List of construction methods =

The list of construction methods covers the processes and techniques used in the construction process. The construction method is essential for civil engineers; utilizing it appropriately can help to achieve the desired results. The term building refers to the creation of physical structures such as buildings, bridges or railways. One of the four types of buildings is residential and building methods are easiest to study in these structures.

== Background ==
Construction involves the creation of physical structures such as buildings, bridges or railways.

Bricks are small rectangular blocks that can be used to form parts of buildings, typically walls. Before 7,000 BC, bricks were formed from hand-molded mud and dried by the sun. During the Industrial Revolution, mass-produced bricks became a common alternative to stone. Stone was typically more expensive, less predictable and more difficult to handle. Bricks remain in common use. They are small and easy to handle, strong in compression, durable and low maintenance. They can be formed into complex shapes, providing ample opportunity for the construction of aesthetic designs.

The four basic types of structure are residential, institutional and commercial, industrial, and infrastructure/heavy.

== Residential ==
Residential buildings go through five main stages, including foundations, formwork, scaffolding, concrete work and reinforcement.

=== Foundation ===
Foundations provide support for structures, transferring their load to layers of soil or rock that have sufficient bearing capacity and suitable settlement characteristics to support them. There are four types of foundation depending on the bearing capacity. Civil engineers will often determine what type of foundation is suitable for the respective bearing capacity.

The foundation construction method depends on considerations such as:

- The nature of the load requiring support
- Ground conditions
- The presence of water
- Space availability
- Accessibility
- Sensitivity to noise and vibration

==== Shallow foundation ====
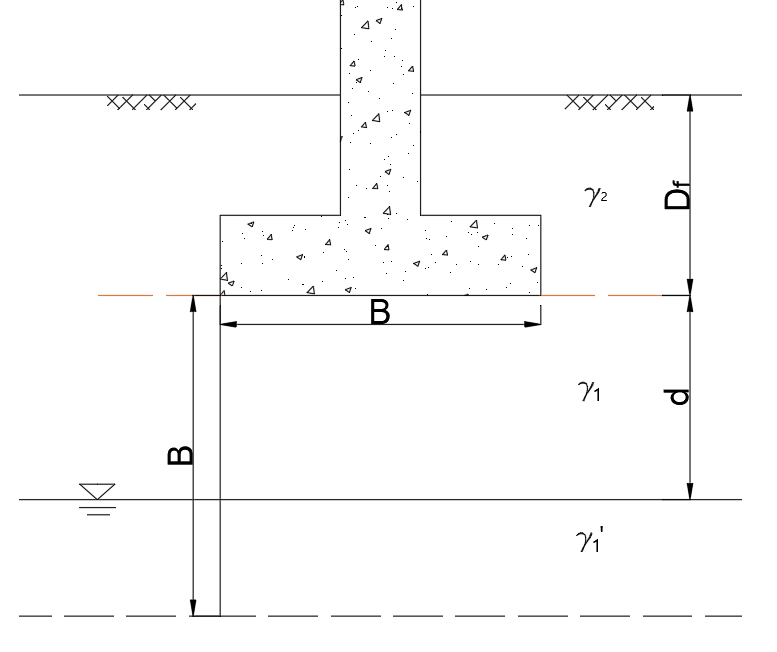
Shallow foundation

Shallow foundations are used where the loads forced by a structure are low relative to the bearing capacity of the surface soils. Deep foundations are needed where the bearing capacity of the surface soils is insufficient. Those loads need to be transferred to deeper layers with higher bearing capacity.

==== Raft or mat foundation ====
Raft foundations are slabs that cover a wide area, often the entire building footprint. They are suitable where ground conditions are too poor to create individual strip or pad foundations for a large number of individual loads. Raft foundations may combine beams to add support for specific loads.

==== Pile foundation ====
Pile foundations are rectangular or circular pads used to support loads such as columns.

==== Strip foundation ====
Strip foundations provide a continuous line of support to a linear structure such as a wall. Trench fill foundations are a variation of strip foundations. The trench excavation is almost completely filled with concrete. Rubble trench foundations are a further variation of trench fill foundations and are a traditional construction method that uses loose stone or rubble to minimise the use of concrete and improve drainage.

=== Formwork ===
Formwork is used for the process of creating a mold into which concrete is poured and solidified. Traditional formwork is fabricated using wood, but it can employ steel, glass fibre, reinforced plastics and other materials.

Formwork for beams takes the form of a box that is supported and propped in the correct position and level. The removal time for the formwork will vary with air temperature, humidity and consequent curing rate. Typical striking times are as follows (using air temperature of 7-16 °C):

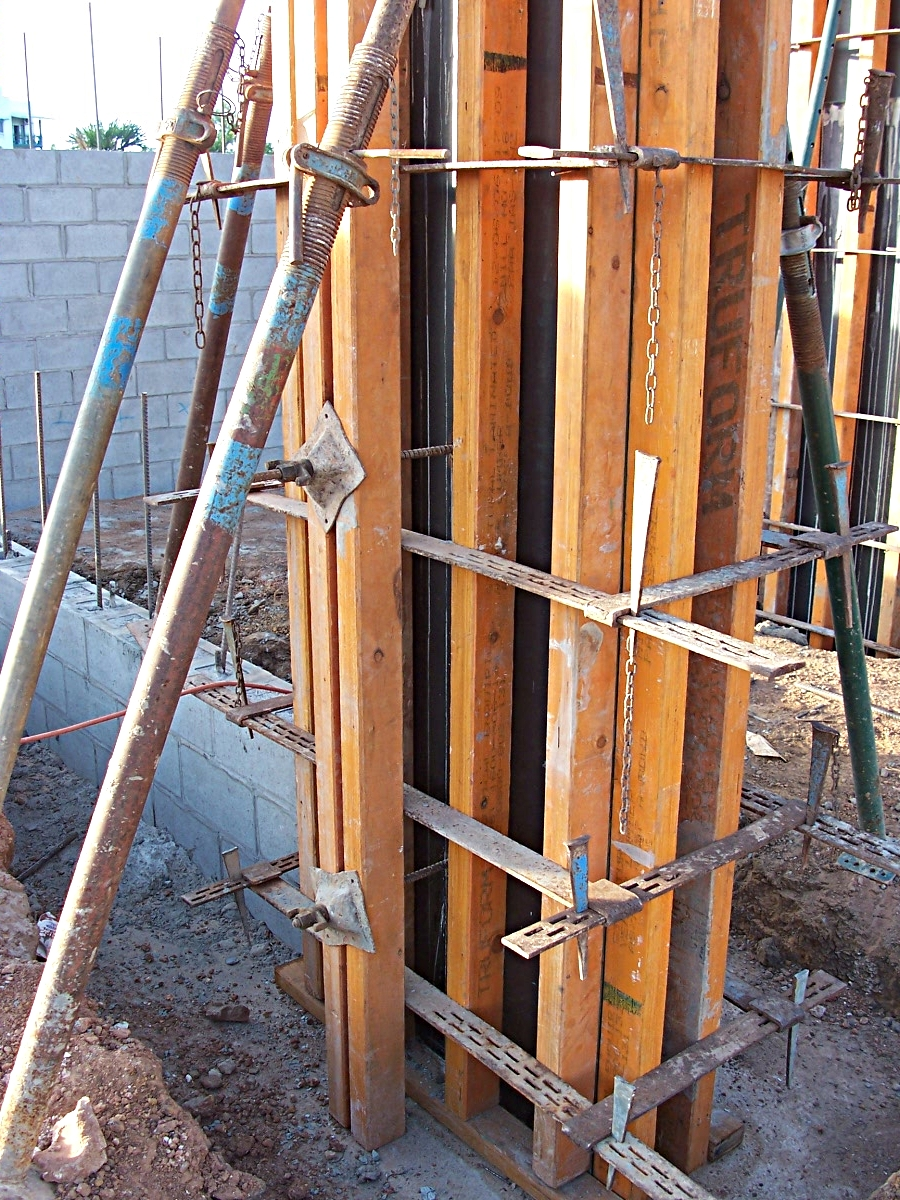
Form work

- Beam sides: 9–12 hours.
- Beam soffits: 8–14 days.
- Beam props: 15–21 days.

This consists of a vertical mold of the desired shape and size matching the column to be poured. To keep the material thickness to a minimum, horizontal steel or timber clamps (or yokes) are used for batch filling and at varying centers for filling that is completed in one pour.

The head of the column can provide support for the beam formwork. Even though this gives good top lateral restraint, it can make the formwork complex. The column can be cast to the underside of the beams. A collar of formwork can be held around the cast column to complete the casting and support the incoming beam.

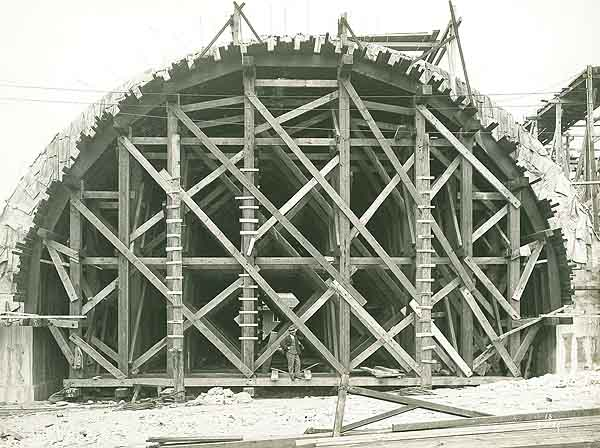
False work

== Falsework ==
Falsework consists of temporary structures used to support a permanent structure. Falsework need to have accurate calculation.

== Bar bending ==
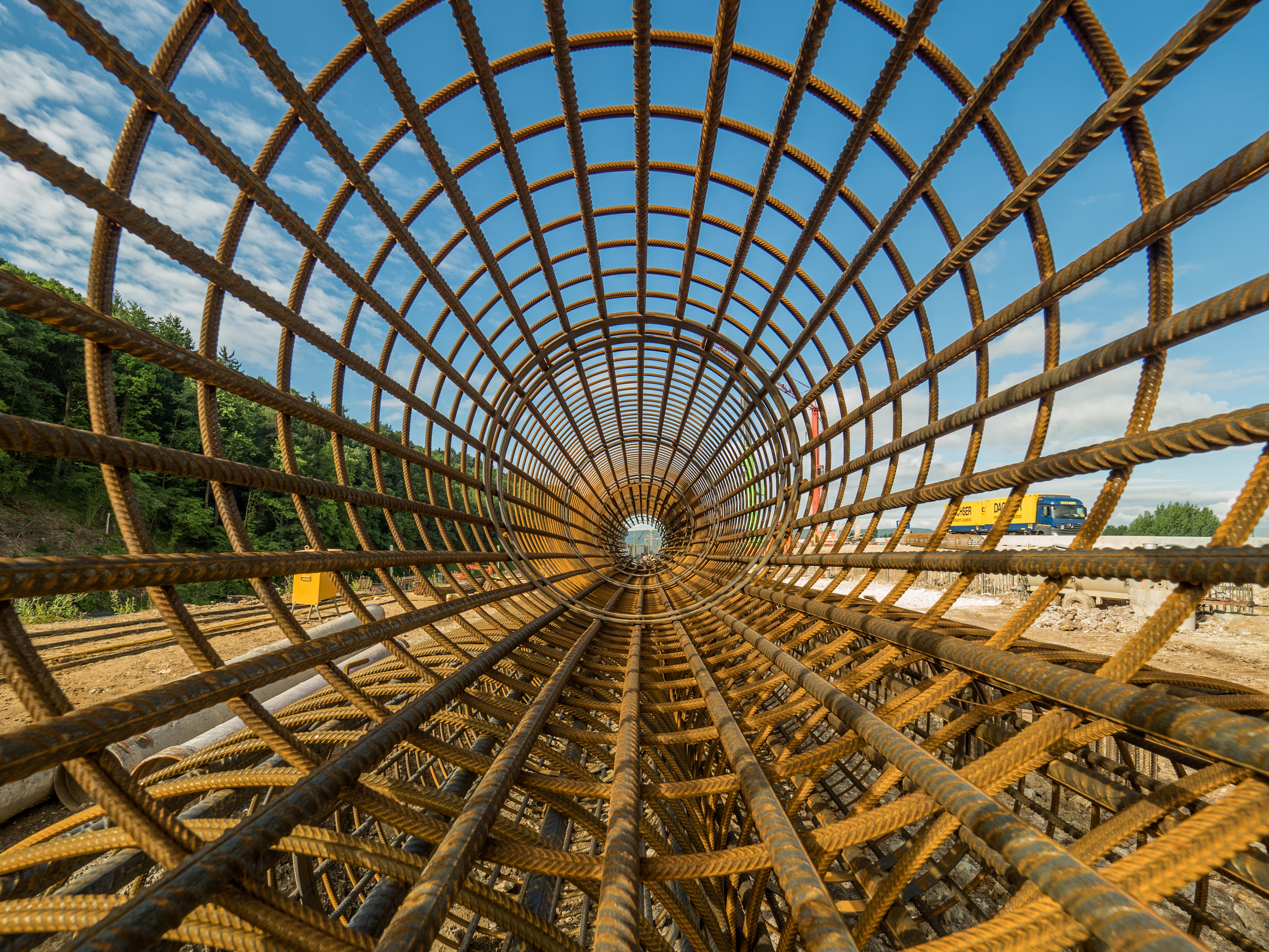
Rebar

Rebar is a steel bar or mesh of steel wires used in reinforced concrete and masonry structures to strengthen and hold the concrete in tension. The surface of rebar is often patterned to improve the quality of the bond with the concrete. Rebar is necessary to add tensile strength, while concrete is strong in compression. It can support tensile loads and increase overall strength by casting rebar into concrete.

=== Concrete ===
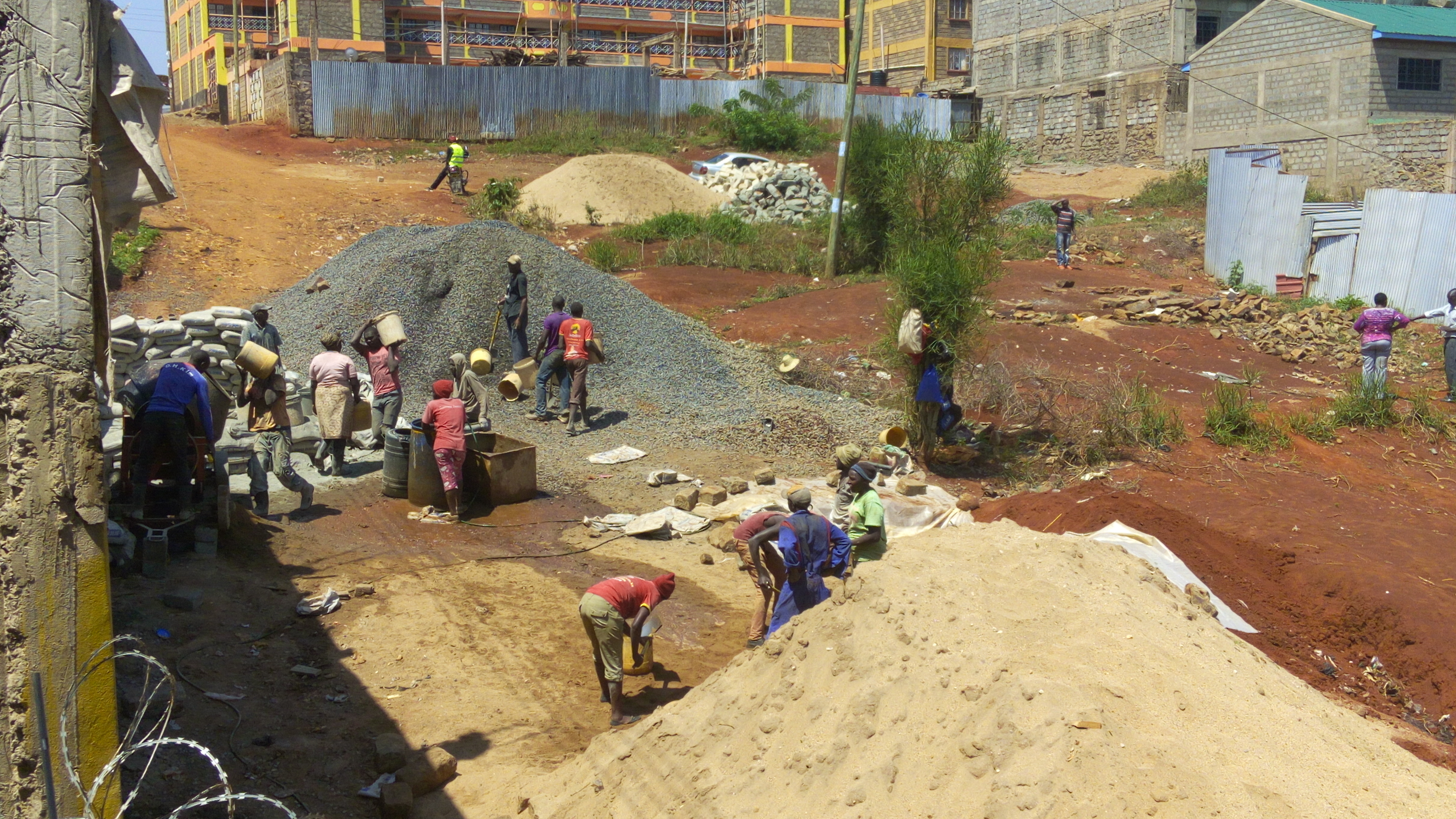
Construction site workers loading water, sand, ballast and cement into a concrete mixer

Concrete is typically used in commercial buildings and civil engineering projects, for its strength and durability. Concrete is a mix of cement and water plus an aggregate such as sand or stone. Its compression strength means it can support heavy weights.

Insulating concrete forms (ICFs) can be used for home construction. They are made by pouring concrete between rigid panels, often made out of polystyrene foam. Rebar can provide additional strength internally, and the exterior panels can remain in place once the concrete sets. It is essential to check the levels of foundation before pouring.

== Brick ==
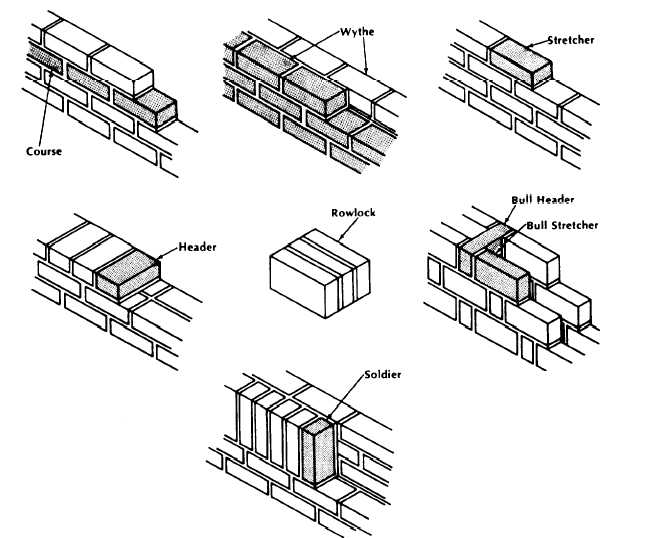
Brick work

Bricks are laid with a mortar joint bonding them. The profile of the mortar can be varied depending on exposure or to create a specific visual effect. The most common profiles are flush (rag joint), bucket handle, weather struck, weather struck and cut and recessed.

The bonding pattern describes the alignment of the bricks. Many standard bond patterns have been defined, including stretcher bond. Each stretcher (brick laid lengthwise) is offset by half a brick relative to the courses above and below of English bond. Stretchers and headers are laid with alternating courses aligned to one another. American common bond is similar to the English bond but with one course of headers for every six stretcher courses. English cross bond has courses of stretchers and headers, but with the alternating stretcher courses offset by half a brick.

Flemish bond consists of alternating stretchers and headers in each course. Header bond has courses of headers offset by half a brick. Stack bond consists of bricks laid directly on top of one another with joints aligned. This is a weak bond and is likely to require reinforcement. Garden wall bond has three courses of stretchers then one course of headers. Sussex bond has three stretchers and one header in each course.
