= Frank Bond House =

- U.S. National Register of Historic Places
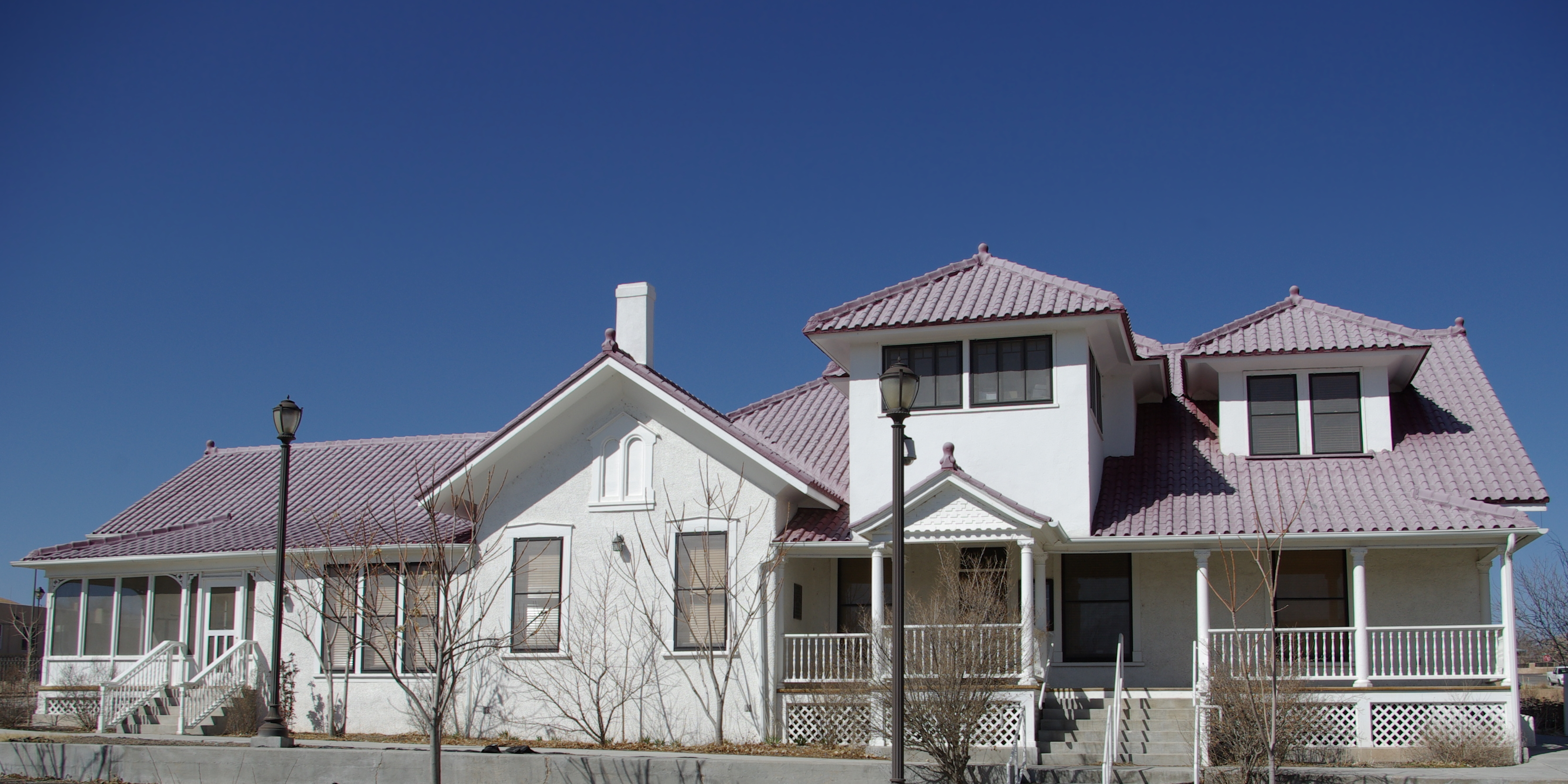

- Location within New Mexico
- Location: Bond St., Espanola, New Mexico
- Coordinates: 35°59′28″N 106°04′57″W
- Area: 0.3 acres (0.12 ha)
- Built: 1887-1911
- Built by: Bond, Frank
- Architectural style: Classical Revival, Territorial Style
- NRHP reference No.: 80002564
- Added to NRHP: March 6, 1980

The Frank Bond House on Bond St. in Espanola, New Mexico was begun in 1887. It was listed on the National Register of Historic Places in 1980.

It is an eclectic Classical Revival-style house, built of adobe over several decades by Frank Bond, who became one of northern New Mexico's leading merchants and sheep dealers.

Bond began the house in 1887 soon after getting married and made additions up to 1911. He lived in the house until 1923.
