= Bond Bridge =

Wi-Fi to IR bridge

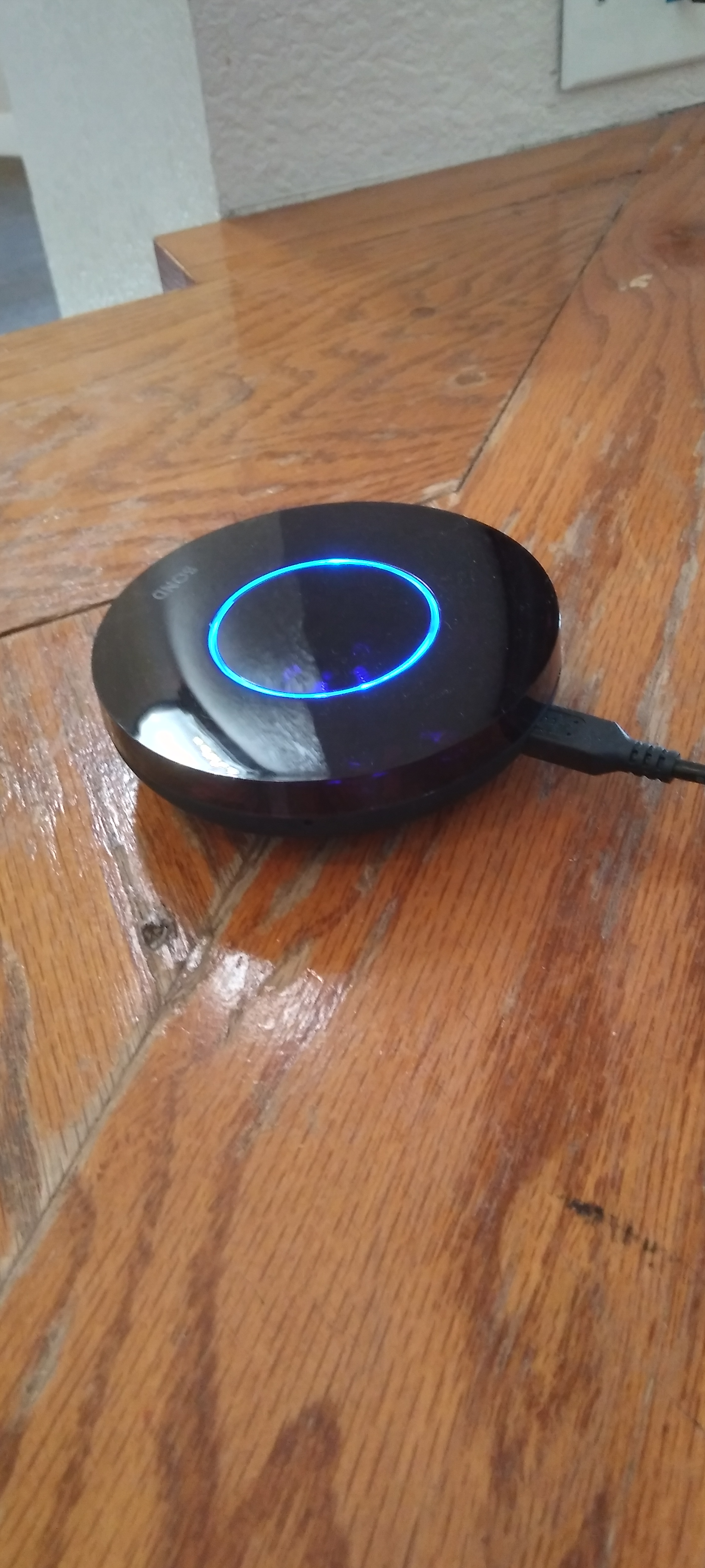
Bond bridge being used in the dining room at Baywood Court

Bond Bridge is a Wi-Fi device that communicates with infra-red or RF controlled devices, such as ceiling fans, shades, and fireplaces. These devices often come with a battery powered remote control. The bond bridge receives commands form a network port, and it forwards the commands to the remote controlled device by simulating the signals the remote control would produce.

The photo shows a bond bridge in the dining room of Baywood Court, a senior community. The bond bridge controls ceiling fans in the dining room.

Broadlink RM4 is a competing product.
