= Bond Inlet =

Inlet in Nunavut, Canada

Bond Inlet (62°12′N 67°45′W) is a body of water in Nunavut's Qikiqtaaluk Region in Canada. It lies in western Hudson Strait, forming a wedge into Baffin Island's Meta Incognita Peninsula and the western slopes of the Everett Mountains.
