= J. Roy Bond House =

Historic house in Kentucky, United States

- U.S. National Register of Historic Places
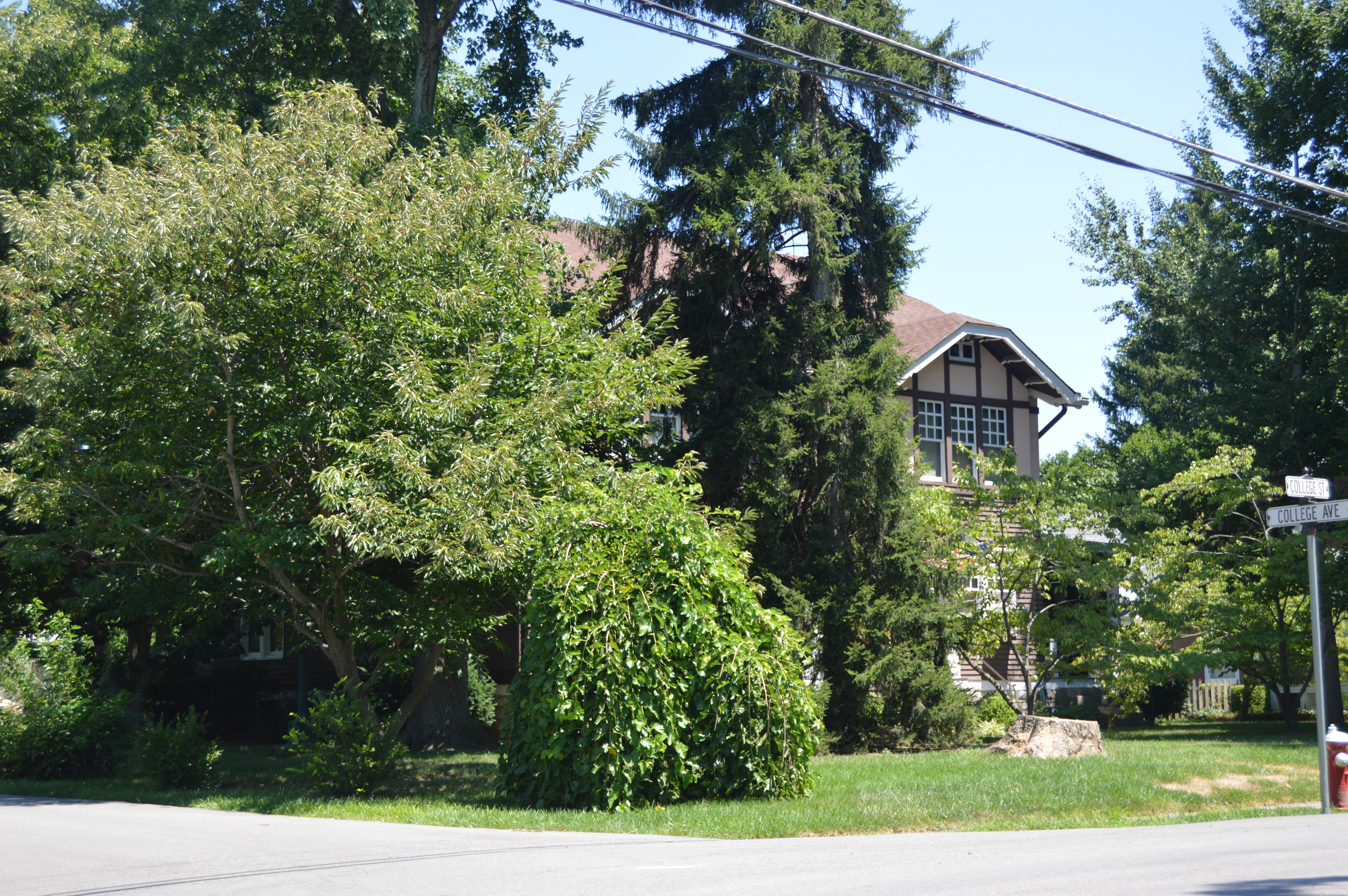

- Location within Kentucky Location within the United States
- Location: 317 College St., Elizabethtown, Kentucky
- Coordinates: 37°41′36″N 85°52′00″W
- Area: less than one acre
- Built: 1914
- Architect: W. Earl Gore
- Architectural style: Bungalow/craftsman
- MPS: Hardin County MRA
- NRHP reference No.: 88001811
- Added to NRHP: October 4, 1988

The J. Roy Bond House, at 317 College St. in Elizabethtown, Kentucky, is a historic Craftsman-style house built in 1914. It was listed on the National Register of Historic Places in 1988.

It is a two-story frame and stucco house with a jerkinhead-roofed one-story front porch. It was designed by Louisville, Kentucky architect W. Earl Gore and was built by real estate developer J. Roy Bond.

It was deemed "significant as the finest example of the Craftsman style in Elizabethtown. The house displays typical Craftsman detailing on the exterior such as exposed half-timbering and the use of stucco, stone and frame siding. The interior is also notable with exposed beams, Craftsman style light fixtures, window seats and decorative brick fireplaces."
