= Witching hour =

Time of night associated with supernatural events

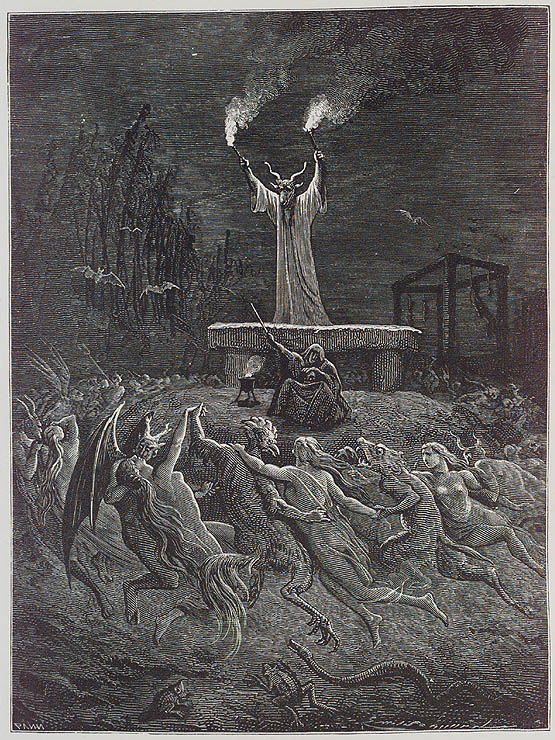
Witches' Sabbath, illustrated by Émile Bayard, 1870

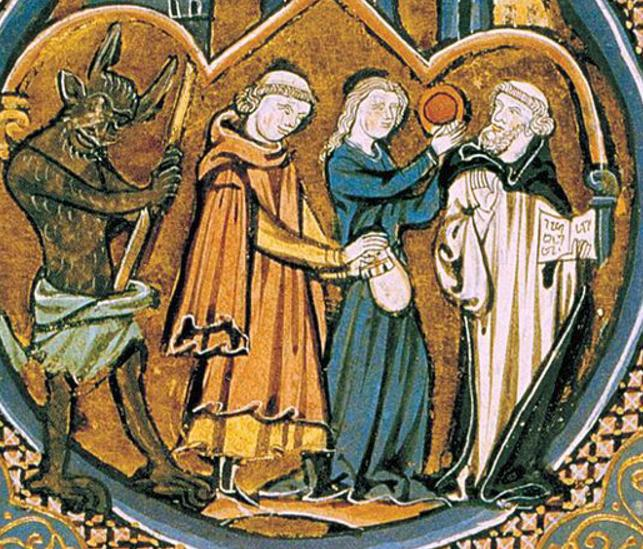
Medieval portrayal of an unclean spirit

In folklore, the witching hour or devil's hour is a time of night that is associated with supernatural events, whereby witches, demons and ghosts are thought to appear and be at their most powerful. Definitions vary, and include the hour immediately after midnight and the period from 3:00 am to 4:00 am. The term now has a widespread colloquial and idiomatic usage that is associated with human physiology and behaviour to more superstitious phenomena, such as luck.

== Origins ==
The phrase "witching hour" began at least as early as 1762, when it appeared in Elizabeth Carolina Keene's Miscellaneous Poems. It alludes to Hamlet's line "Tis now the very witching time of night, When Churchyards yawne, and hell it selfe breakes out Contagion to this world."

== Time ==
There are multiple times that can be considered the witching hour. Some claim the period from midnight to 1:00 am, while others claim there is increased supernatural activity from dusk to dawn. The New Zealand Oxford Dictionary identifies midnight as the time when witches are supposedly active.

During the time in which this term originated, many people had sleeping schedules that meant they were awake during the middle of the night. Nonetheless, there is psychological literature suggesting that apparitional experiences and sensed presences are most common between the hours of 2:00 am and 4:00 am, corresponding with a 3:00 am peak in the amount of melatonin in the body.

== Physiology ==
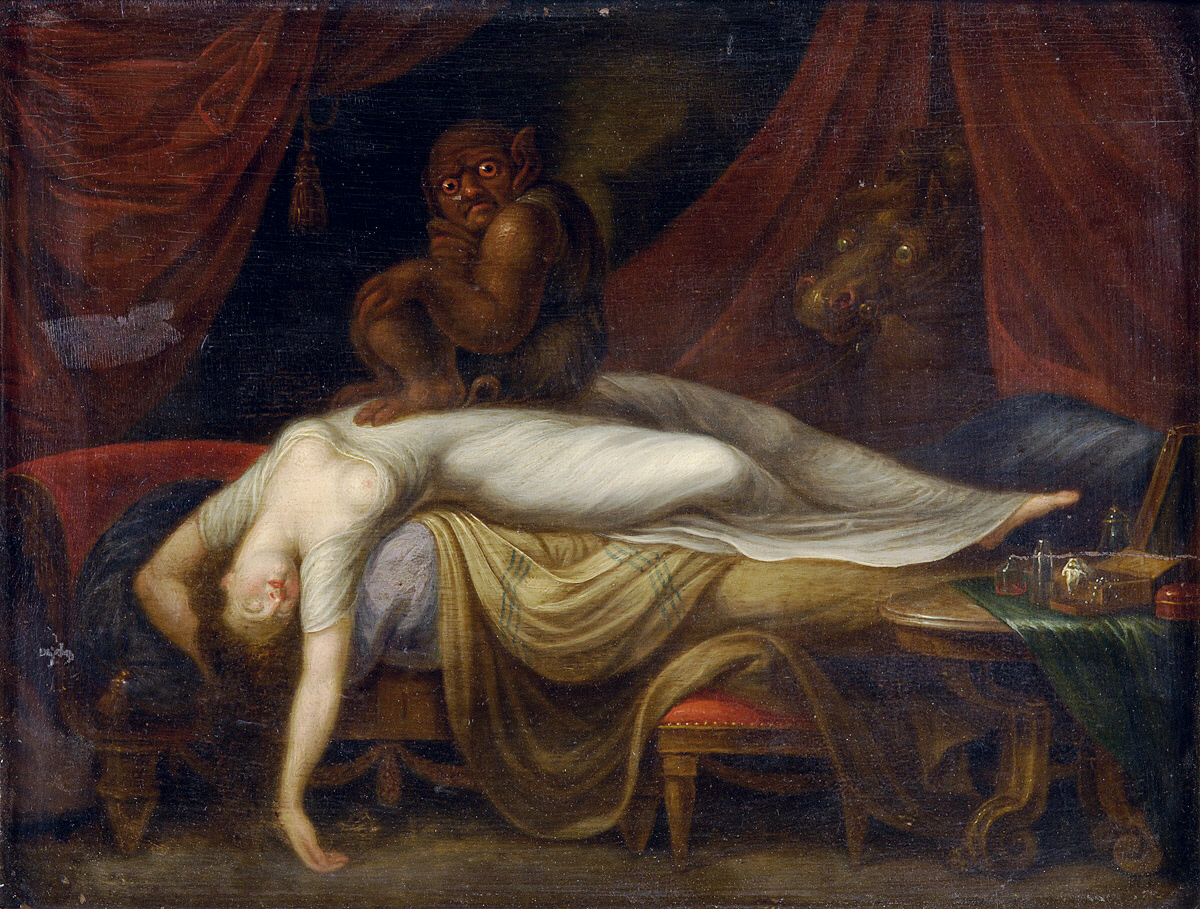
A 19th-century version of Henry Füssli's The Nightmare (1781)

The idea of the witching hour may stem from the human sleep cycle and circadian rhythm – the body is going through REM sleep at that time, where the heart rate is slower, body temperature reduced, breathing pattern and blood pressure irregular. Sudden awakening from REM sleep could cause agitation, fear and disorientation in an individual.

During REM sleep, which usually occurs within the witching hour, unpleasant and frightful sleep disturbances such as parasomnias can be experienced, which include nightmares, rapid eye movement sleep behavior disorder, night terrors, sleepwalking, homicidal sleepwalking and sleep paralysis.

During the night and well into the witching hour, symptoms of illnesses and conditions such as lung disease, asthma, flu and common cold seem to exacerbate because there is less cortisol in the blood late at night and especially during sleep. As such, the immune system becomes very active and white blood cells fight infections in the body during sleep, and this would thereby worsen the symptoms of fever, nasal congestion, cough, chills and sweating.

== Colloquial usage ==
The term may be used colloquially to refer to any period of bad luck, or in which something bad is seen as having a greater likelihood of occurring.

In investing, it is the last hour of stock trading between 3:00 pm (when the U.S. bond market closes) and 4:00 pm EST (when the U.S. stock market closes), a period of above-average volatility.

The term can also refer to a phenomenon where infants or young children cry for an extended period of time during the hour (or two) before their bedtime, becoming irritable and unwieldy with no known cause.

To reduce gun violence, curfew hours in Washington D.C. have been in force between 11:00 pm and midnight to lower juvenile gunfire incidents. Influenced by the idea of "witching hour", this occurs between 11:00 pm and 11:59 pm on weekdays and is referred to as the "switching hour". Furthermore, violent crimes like rape and sexual assault would peak at midnight on average and DUI police incidents would usually tend to occur at around 2:00 am.

== See also ==
- Brahmamuhurtha
- Canonical hours
- Exorcism in Christianity
- Sacramentals
- Ushi no toki mairi
- Watches of the Night
