= William Bonde =

William Bonde (died 1530) was a Bridgettine monk and author. His Pilgrimage of Perfection has been described as "the last synthesis of the contemplative life to be published before the Reformation”.

Bonde was a brother at Syon Abbey. He published Pilgrimage of Perfection in English rather than Latin, to help those in the religious life who lacked Latin. The book, published anonymously, was printed by Wynkyn de Worde, who had connections with Syon Abbey.
