= Dave Days =

American musician and YouTuber

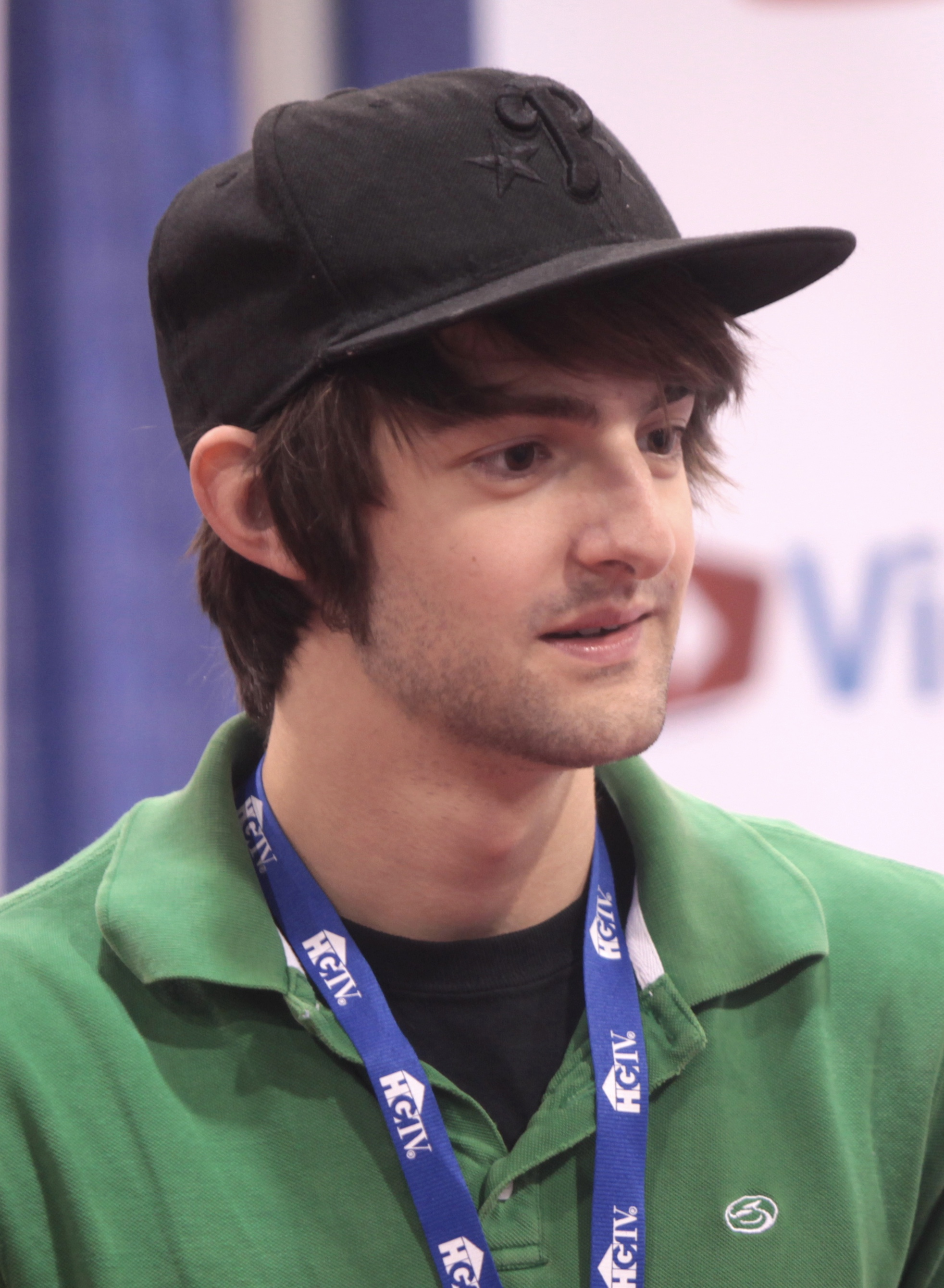
- Dave Days at VidCon 2014

Background information
- Born: David Joseph Colditz; August 13, 1991 (age 35)
- Origin: Downingtown, Pennsylvania, U.S.
- Genres: Pop punk; comedy rock
- Occupations: Singer-songwriter; musician
- Instruments: Vocals; guitar; piano
- Years active: 2007–2021, 2026-present

David Joseph Colditz (born August 13, 1991), commonly known as Dave Days, is an American musician and internet personality. He is best known for his YouTube channel featuring pop-punk covers, parodies of popular songs, and original songs. As of September 2021, Days' YouTube channel has over 1.5 million subscribers, and has had more than 370 million views.

== Career ==
In middle school, Days started playing in bands. He taught himself how to use audio and video production equipment, and while attending Downingtown High School East became interested in YouTube. He created his YouTube channel on August 25, 2007, which debuted with the release of Chocolate Rain (Pop-Punk Parody), and followed with a series of other videos parodying popular YouTube videos and performers. As "Dave Days", he quickly attracted enough of an audience to become a YouTube partner (earning income from advertisements) and, after just over a year, had over 200,000 subscribers and over 50 million views. One month after finishing high school, Days moved to Los Angeles to pursue music, incorporated himself as Dave Days, Inc., and continued to release YouTube videos.

Several of Days' songs and videos from 2008 to 2010 focused on Miley Cyrus, which led to her making a cameo appearance in Days' 2010 video Miley Cyrus – My Last Song for Miley (Dave Days). By early 2010, Days was the most-subscribed musician on YouTube.

His 2011 YouTube videos Next to You and Who Says placed in Billboard's uncharted top 10, and his send-up of Katy Perry in a parody of Last Friday Night garnered attention. In October 2011, Days was again the most-subscribed musician on YouTube, with 1.5 million subscribers.

On September 11, 2011, Days performed "What Does It Take" on Disney Channel's So Random. In 2011, Days was the first YouTube personality to sign for the DigiTour, and in 2012 he was a DigiTour headliner. On December 7, 2013, Days and Rebecca Black released a music video for "Saturday", a single and sequel to Black's Friday.

Days produces his own music and videos. As of January 2024, Days has released 231 videos, which have had over 380 million combined views. He plays guitar left-handed.

== Selected discography ==
- The Dave Days Show (2009)
- Imma Be Down With Fireflies Baby (2010)
- Dinner and a Movie (2010)
- We're Just Kids (2012)
- Boy You'll Forget (2013)
- The Dave Days of Christmas (2014)
- Pizza Ship (2015)
- Dave Days (2021)

=== Charting singles ===
Title	Year	Peak chart positions	Album
Title	Year	US	Album
"Saturday" (with Rebecca Black)	2013	55	Non-album single
