= Foolish (Rebecca Black song) =

2017 single by Rebecca Black

Single by Rebecca Black

from the EP RE / BL
- Released: April 21, 2017
- Genre: Electropop
- Length: c. 3:11
- Label: Self-released
- Songwriters: Rebecca Black; Shari Short; Greg Ogan; Spencer Neezy
- Producers: Greg Ogan; Spencer Neezy

Rebecca Black singles chronology
| "The Great Divide" (2016) | "Foolish" (2017) | "Heart Full of Scars" (2017) |

Music video
- "Foolish" on YouTube

"Foolish" is a song by American singer Rebecca Black. She released it as a single on April 21, 2017. It followed "The Great Divide", which came out the previous year and was her first new song in three years. "Foolish" was later included on her EP RE / BL, released on September 15, 2017.

Black wrote the song at 18, when she was starting her first relationship. A music video premiered on Entertainment Weekly a week after the single came out.

== Background ==
In 2011, when she was 13, Black became widely known for "Friday". Its music video went viral on YouTube, passing 100 million views and drawing a lot of negative attention. She later became a YouTuber with more than a million subscribers. By 2017 she was releasing music again and writing her own songs, and she said she wanted people to think of her as a musician and songwriter, not just an internet meme. She told Paper that it had been hard for years to get people to take her seriously.

== Writing and composition ==
Black told Time that the song came out of a night when she and her boyfriend were lying in bed listening to a Coldplay record. When the record ended, all they could hear was the buzz of the turntable, and she remembered it as the calmest and most intimate moment they had shared.

She described the title as the feeling of falling in love for the first time. In her words to Billboard, people do things they normally wouldn't for someone, and she wanted the song to capture how love feels at 19.

Time called "Foolish" a dreamy summer pop song. Billboard called it a dreamy pop track and quoted the line "I'm addicted to your everything". It said the song showed a sexier side of Black than "The Great Divide", a breakup ballad, or "Friday". Entertainment Weekly described it as an addictive electro-pop jam. Black told Paper that the song was close to the sound and style she wanted for her music from then on.

== Release and music video ==
"Foolish" came out as audio only on April 21, 2017. Black was filming its video that day at the YouTube Space in Los Angeles. Billboard reported that a teaser showed a neon-lit dance club, and that the video's directors had also made DNCE's "Cake by the Ocean" video.

The video premiered exclusively on Entertainment Weekly on April 28, 2017. In it, Black goes to a club and later appears in a late-night scene at a pool. She said she and the directors wanted the video to show how people take risks and try new things when they fall in love.
