= My Moment =

My Moment may refer to:

== Music ==
- My Moment (album), by Tee Grizzley, 2017
- My Moment (EP), by Ha Sung-woon, 2019
- "My Moment" (DJ Drama song), 2012
- "My Moment" (Rebecca Black song), 2011
- "My Moment", a song by Moses Stone, 2012
- "My Moment", a song by Zee Kay (Zach Knight), 2008

== Television ==
- "My Moment", an episode of Infinite Ryvius
- Trey Songz: My Moment, a 2010 documentary about Trey Songz

== See also ==
- Meu Momento (English: My Moment), an album by Wanessa, 2009
