= What Does It Take =

What Does It Take may refer to:

- "What Does It Take" (Dave Days song), 2010
- "What Does It Take (To Keep a Man Like You Satisfied)", a 1967 single by Skeeter Davis
- "What Does It Take (To Win Your Love)", a 1969 single by Jr. Walker & The All Stars
- "What Does It Take", a 1989 single by Then Jerico
- "What Does It Take", a 1986 single by Honeymoon Suite
