= Person of Interest (song) =

Single by Rebecca Black
- Released: November 15, 2011
- Genre: Dance-pop
- Length: 3:20
- Label: RB Records
- Songwriters: Rebecca Black, Charlton Pettus, Wendy Page

Rebecca Black singles chronology
"My Moment" (2011)	"Person of Interest" (2011)	"Sing It" (2012)

Music video
- "Person of Interest" on YouTube

"Person of Interest" is a song by American singer Rebecca Black. It was released on the iTunes Store under the label RB Records, as Black's third single on November 15, 2011. The accompanying music video was also released on that day. The song received mixed reviews from critics, though they were not as critical as for her previous singles.

== Background ==
On October 25, 2011, Black announced via Twitter that she was in the filming process of her music video for her upcoming single. Five days later Black confirmed that the title of the upcoming single was "Person of Interest". Later that day, Black spoke with mun2, a Latino broadcast channel. On November 10, she revealed the cover artwork for "Person of Interest" on her Facebook page.

== Composition ==
"Person of Interest"
A sample of the song's chorus.

The song is played in an E minor key and follows the chord progression C−G/B−Em for most of the song. Rebecca Black describes "Person of Interest" as "a love song but it's not a love song. It's about almost teenage crushes — when you're not in love yet but you really like a guy — which I'm really excited about because I don't think there are too many out like that. It's very much a dance type song. It will make you get up and dance and sing along in your car."

The song opens with Black singing "When I talk, you listen, I like that/When you listen, you smile and I like that/Why you lookin' lookin' at me just like that?" Near the end of the song, Black sings "Can't deny, you're implicated/In the mayhem in my mind/What has got me so frustrated/You should be mine, you should be mine"

== Reception ==
"Person of Interest" received mixed to negative reviews from music critics. Entertainment Weekly admitted that the song "could totally pass as a throwaway Selena Gomez or early Miley Cyrus track, so she’s got that going for her in the teen-pop realm." James Montgomery of MTV News criticized the use of pitch correction on Black's vocals saying "Her voice is still lacquered with studio sheen, particularly on the chorus and the "emotive" breakdown toward the back end, when all the instrumentation falls away and we're left with nothing more than Black's squelched-yet-slippery vocals." Nora Gasparian of HollyscoopTV described the song as "corny" and said "The song actually sounds a lot like Katy Perry's "Last Friday Night (T.G.I.F.)" Lauren Croteau of KOvideo stated "The lyrics are lacking a bit but it's a far cry better than what we saw in "Friday"."

== Music video ==
On November 3, 2011, Black posted a teaser of the music video on her YouTube channel and again on November 10 with a small sneak peek of the song playing in the background. "Person of Interest" and its music video were released on November 15, 2011. Within 48 hours of its release, the video received over 1,000,000 views on YouTube.

The video opens with the camera zoomed in on a police line. Black is then seen inside the police line describing to a police officer the appearance of her "person of interest" while the officer draws a sketch on a piece of paper. She is then seen competing in fun activities in an amusement park with her person of interest, a kid who resembles Justin Bieber, portrayed by Alex Constancio, such as mini-golf and riding on go karts. The video ends with Black walking off with her person of interest outside the police line. The video was shot at Golf N' Stuff in Norwalk, California, which is also known for having been a location in the movie The Karate Kid.

== Track listing ==
- Digital download
1. "Person of Interest" – 3:20
