= Salvation (EP) =

EP by Rebecca Black
- Released: February 27, 2025
- Genres: Pop; hyperpop
- Length: 20:58
- Label: Self-released
- Producers: Marcus Andersson; Chris Lyon; Stint; Nightfeelings; Medium; Novodor; Johan Lenox; Zhone

Rebecca Black chronology
| Let Her Burn (2023) | Salvation (2025) | Age of the Exhibitionist (2026) |

Singles from Salvation
- 1. "Trust!" Released: October 18, 2024; 2. "Sugar Water Cyanide" Released: December 5, 2024; 3. "Salvation" Released: February 27, 2025

Salvation is the third EP by American singer Rebecca Black. It was released independently on February 27, 2025, after the 2025 California wildfires caused it to be delayed by a month.

Salvation explores the idealization of female pop artists, along with themes such as queerhood and its place in religion. It was promoted with three singles, "Trust!", "Sugar Water Cyanide" and "Salvation", along with a tour across North America and Europe. It received mixed reviews upon release, with critics taking issue with the album's lyricism and production.

== Background ==
Black performed as a disc jockey at a Boiler Room show in September 2024; she ended it with a cover of her 2011 single "Friday" over the instrumental of Charli XCX's "360". Speaking to Grammy.com about the set, Black mentioned, "It was honestly one of the best times I've ever had DJing." Black wanted Salvation to be the direct opposite of her previous album, Let Her Burn (2023), calling it "a world of experimentation" and stating that she wanted it to feel "succinct and cohesive".

In an interview with NME about Salvation, Black described it as "really quite different thematically" than Let Her Burn. When speaking about the track "American Doll", she expressed concerns about how female pop artists are expected to be flawless, stating, "You might feel like you're at your most competent and [at a] beautiful moment, but people will still find ways to pick it apart". She also discussed the religious themes of the title track, "Salvation", stating, "The idea of making a song about celebrating your own queerness in a religious context felt like taking back power. It also felt really fun." Speaking with Newsweek, Black mentioned that the goal of the album was to explore.

== Singles and release ==
Black released the single "Trust!" on October 18, 2024, along with a music video. Speaking with Paper, she stated, "It felt only right to kick off the next project with the loudest and brashest track I've put out yet, and 'Trust!' embodies the essence of the fearlessness in this project better than anything." "Sugar Water Cyanide" was released on December 5, 2024; Black called it "like if my drug of choice were a person" and said she wanted to "make that song you could only really hear on 100% volume in your car or busting through the bass in the club."

The album was promoted with a tour from March to April across North America and Europe, covering the United States, the Netherlands, Germany, Belgium, the United Kingdom, Ireland, and Canada. Salvation was released on February 27, 2025, along with the title track. The album came a month after its planned release due to a delay caused by the 2025 California wildfires. Black called it a "very obvious" decision and stated that she had spent the delay helping friends that had been impacted by the wildfires. Various sources refer to Salvation as a hyperpop album.

== Reception ==
Professional ratings
Aggregate scores
| Source | Rating |
|---|---|
| Metacritic | 52/100 |
Review scores
| Source | Rating |
| Beats Per Minute | 46% |
| DIY | 4.5/5 stars |
| The Line of Best Fit | 5/10 |
| The Needle Drop | 7/10 (Note: Fantano specifically gave the album a "decent to strong 7".) |
| Paste | 2/10 |

Upon release, Salvation received mixed reviews from critics. On the review aggregating website Metacritic, the album received a normalized rating of 52 out of 100 based on 4 critical reviews. Sam Franzini of The Line of Best Fit gave the album a 5/10 in an ambivalent review; he believed "Do You Even Think About Me?" to be thrilling but thought that the album lacked personality. Franzini stated, "The record is certainly sparkly, but its hollowness is glaring."

Writing for DIY, Otis Robinson gave the album a rating of 4.5 out of 5 stars, stating that it "proves Rebecca Black's got guts, and that it's time she got her flowers." Robinson called Salvation "huge", describing it as "no-skips" and comparing the track "Twist the Knife" to Kylie Minogue and Kim Petras.

Paste music editor Matt Mitchell gave Salvation a 2/10, calling it "the first great pop failure in the wake of Charli xcx's Brat supremacy." Mitchell criticised the lyricism of the album heavily, finding "American Doll" to be nonsensical and describing "Twist the Knife" as "an even greater blemish on the English language". Mitchell further took issue with the production, labeling songs like "Trust!" and "Do You Ever Think About Me?" as "any raggedy dance track spilling out of department store stereos".

== Track listing ==
Salvation track listing
| No. | Title | Writer(s) | Producer(s) | Length |
|---|---|---|---|---|
| 1. | "Salvation" | Rebecca Black; Lauren Aquilina; Christopher Lyon; Marcus Andersson | Lyon; Andersson | 3:20 |
| 2. | "Trust!" | Black; Emelie Walcott; Ajay Bhattacharyya | Stint | 2:51 |
| 3. | "Sugar Water Cyanide" | Black; Jesse Saint John; Nick Weiss | Nightfeelings | 2:54 |
| 4. | "American Doll" | Black; Clara Christensen; Saint John; Weiss; Hannes Roovers; Isac Hördegård | Nightfeelings; Medium | 2:15 |
| 5. | "Tears in My Pocket" | Black; Aquilina; Lyon; Andersson | Lyon; Andersson | 2:57 |
| 6. | "Do You Even Think About Me?" | Black; Aquilina; Lyon; Andersson | Lyon; Andersson | 3:16 |
| 7. | "Twist the Knife" | Black; Saint John; Kevin Hickey; Adam Novodor; Johan Lenox | Zhone; Novodor; Lenox | 3:25 |
| Total length: | | | | 20:58 |

=== Notes ===
- "Trust!" is stylized in all caps.

== Personnel ==
Credits adapted from Tidal.

- Rebecca Black – vocals
- Lars Stalfors – mixing
- Alan JS Han – spatial mixing
- John Greenham – mastering
- Matt Boerum – spatial mastering
