= Rebecca Black Was Here =

EP by Rebecca Black
- Released: June 16, 2021
- Genres: Pop; Hyperpop
- Length: 18:41
- Label: Self-released
- Producers: Micah Jasper; Ceci G; Glitch Gum; Joshua Murty; Cody Tarpley; Marshall Vore

Rebecca Black chronology
Rebecca Black (Live Session, Los Angeles, California, 2019) (2020)	Rebecca Black Was Here (2021)	Let Her Burn (2023)

Singles from Rebecca Black Was Here
- 1. "Girlfriend" Released: January 29, 2021; 2. "Personal" Released: April 23, 2021; 3. "Worth It for the Feeling" Released: May 21, 2021

Rebecca Black Was Here is the second EP by American singer Rebecca Black. It was released independently on June 16, 2021.

== Background ==
Black released the singles "Self Sabotage", "Closer" and "Alone Together" in 2020, as well as collaboration singles with Dani Ride, "Ven Dímelo (Love Is Love)", and Dorian Electra on "Edgelord". Black recorded the extended play almost entirely at her home in Los Angeles. Black felt like her 2021 releases were a reintroduction for her to the world for her current musical direction, and felt that the title Rebecca Black Was Here, originally beginning as a joke, represented this idea well. Rebecca Black Was Here was a project where Black felt like she had more direct control over the content.

Black wrote "Girlfriend" about her experiences of coming out and her own personal relationship experiences. Black described "Personal" as a song that dealt with the guilt of ending a relationship.

== Singles and release ==
Black released the single "Girlfriend" on January 29, 2021, along with a music video, followed on February 10, 2021 with a remix of "Friday" to commemorate the song's tenth anniversary. Produced by Dylan Brady of 100 gecs, the remix featured performances by 3OH!3, Big Freedia and Dorian Electra, which Black found liberating, as a way to reclaim and redefine the song on her own terms. These were followed by "Personal" on April 23, 2021, and "Worth It for the Feeling" on May 21, 2021, which was released alongside the announcement of the extended play.

The album was promoted by Black's first headlining tour held in the United States in January 2022.

== Reception ==
El Hunt of NME gave the extended play four stars out of five, describing the album as being "filled with [a] sense of fun" that "gives a far clearer sense of who Black is as a musician" compared to her 2017 EP RE/BL. Elly Watson of DIY Mag similarly awarded Rebecca Black Was Here four stars, describing the release as something that reintroduced Black "as a blossoming hyperpop prodigy" and feeling that the release represented Black finding her artistic voice.

Reviewers noted the release's blend of mainstream pop music with hyperpop, and drew similarities to British musician Charli XCX.

At the 2022 Libera Awards, Rebecca Black Was Here was nominated for Self-Released Record of the Year.

== Track listing ==
Rebecca Black Was Here track listing
No.	Title	Writer(s)	Producer(s)	Length
1.	"Better in My Memory"	Rebecca Black; David Charles Fischer; Micah Jasper; Cecilia Gomez	Jasper; Ceci G	2:51
2.	"Personal"	Black; Paris Carney; Jasper	Jasper	2:32
3.	"NGL"	Black; Luke Daniel Huff; Marshall Vore	Glitch Gum; Vore	3:27
4.	"Blue"	Black; Carney; Cody Tarpley	Tarpley	3:22
5.	"Worth It for the Feeling"	Black; Carney; Joshua Murty; Rachel Kanner	Murty	3:07
6.	"Girlfriend"	Black; Fischer; Jasper	Jasper	3:24
Total length:				18:41
