= Let Her Burn =

2023 studio album by Rebecca Black

Studio album by Rebecca Black
- Released: February 9, 2023
- Genres: Pop; electropop; hyperpop
- Length: 30:35
- Label: RB Records / Warner
- Producers: Lionel Crasta; Ceci G; Kevin Hissink; Micah Jasper; Matias Mora; Oscar Scheller; Stint; Gian Stone

Rebecca Black chronology
Rebecca Black Was Here (2021)	Let Her Burn (2023)	Salvation (2025)

Singles from Let Her Burn
- 1. "Crumbs" Released: November 14, 2022; 2. "Look at You" Released: December 7, 2022; 3. "Sick to My Stomach" Released: January 18, 2023

Let Her Burn is the debut studio album by American singer Rebecca Black, self-released on February 9, 2023. Although Black had become known over a decade earlier through her viral 2011 debut single, "Friday", and had since released several other singles and EPs, Let Her Burn is her first full-length album. Several websites included the album in their lists of the most anticipated albums of the year, and it was preceded by three singles: "Crumbs", "Look at You" and "Sick to My Stomach".

== History ==
Black became well-known at the age of thirteen when the music video for her 2011 single "Friday" went viral on YouTube and other social media sites. At VidCon 2015, Black revealed that she had been working on an album which she hoped to release by the end of 2015. However, no album or new original songs were released. Black instead released her first EP, RE / BL, in September 2017, and a second, Rebecca Black Was Here, in June 2021.

On November 10, 2022, Black finally announced her first true full-length album, to be released sometime in early 2023. Clash noted that the album "builds on a foundation of singles that have lit up the internet", and that "Rebecca Black blends superb lyricism that display in full 360 with impeccable songwriting". Black herself said in releasing the first single from the album, "As I enter this new moment, I wanted to explore the vulnerability I've felt in finding balance with submission, dominance, and sexuality. I've had to dive into my own body to feel the deeply powerful but also dangerous feelings of relinquishing control". She stated with the release of the second single that "a pretty poignant theme of my upcoming album is perception of self and how performance holds multiple pieces of my life".

=== Inclusion in "most anticipated album" lists ===
A number of reviewers included the album in their lists of the most anticipated albums of the year. Queerty listed the album as one of the top five "most anticipated queer albums of 2023", and Them named it as one of "11 Albums by LGBTQ+ Musicians We're Excited to Listen to in 2023". PopSugar listed it on their "33 Most Anticipated Albums of 2023", stating that Black, having "created a viral moment on YouTube in 2011 — plans to show off her vocal range for the first time in over a decade with the release of her debut album". DIY listed the album as one of "DIY's Big Albums of 2023", stating that "with 'Let her Burn' Rebecca is set to make her name as one of the most exciting names in pop".

=== Tour, cover art, and date of release ===
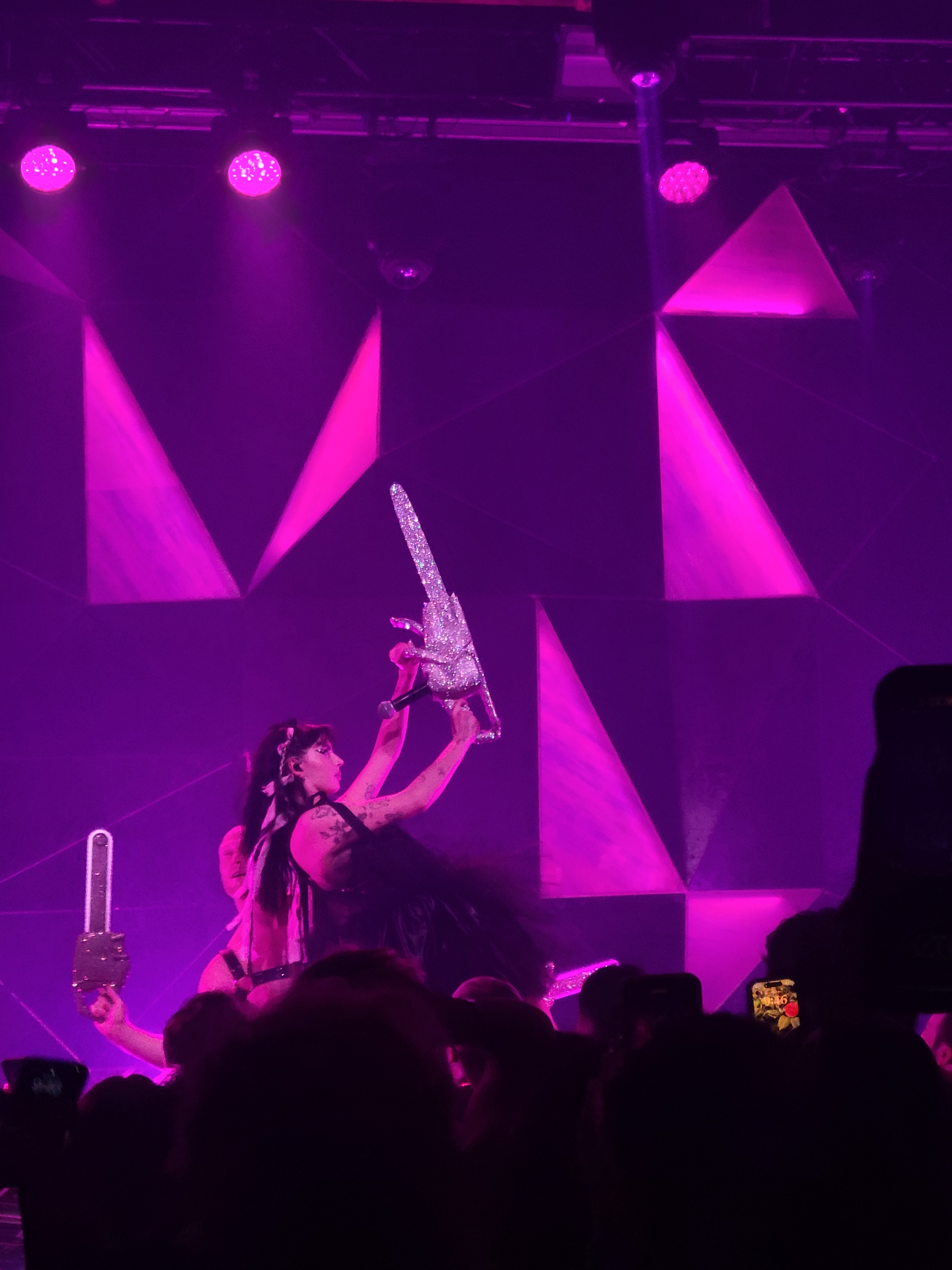
Black wielding a rhinestone encrusted chainsaw while performing at Elsewhere in Brooklyn on her 2023 Let Her Burn tour

In December 2022, Black also announced her "Let Her Burn Tour" in support of the album, beginning in Dublin, Ireland, on February 4, and continuing for five UK shows. The following month, she announced eleven North American tour dates, occurring in May. Out magazine named Black's tour as one of its "5 Tours From LGBTQ+ Musicians We're Dying to Go See", and the Manchester Evening News highlighted Black's February 7 tour appearance at Gorilla as one of its "gigs we're going to in February 2023".

Black posted the cover art for the album on January 6, 2023, at which time NME, Uproxx and other sources reported that the album would be released on February 9. Black released the tracklist for the album on January 18, 2023. Her first U.S. tour appearance in Boston was positively reviewed, with Melodic writing:

Rebecca came to slay in one of the best stage entrances we’ve seen to date. ... The energy was high all night and Rebecca knows how to put on a spectacular show. From her fabulous dancers and their costume changes and choreography, to the lighting design and even her bringing out a giant bedazzled chainsaw that doubled as a mic holder, it was surely a night to remember.

Over the course of the year, additional dates were added. On June 1, 2023, it was announced that Black would also perform as one of the opening acts for Blackpink, along with Sabrina Carpenter, The Rose, Caity Baser, and others, at the July 2, 2023, British Summer Time in Hyde Park, London. It was also announced the same day that Black would perform at the June 23, 2023, Ladyland Festival in Brooklyn, headlined by Honey Dijon and Peaches.

== Singles ==
The first single released from the album, "Crumbs", debuted with a music video in November 2022, featuring Black as a coroner, performing an autopsy on her own body. PopSugar described the track as "a sultry dance", and BrooklynVegan described it as "a hypnotic electropop track", while Paper's review of the song said "intoxicating dance beat ebbs and flows with Black's sultry whisper-sing, inching into a moan as she explores her deepest carnal desires. Stuttering electronic breakdowns and dissonant synths usher in a club-ready sound for Black, perfect for Pride 2023". Them reviewed the song as "a serious pop banger" and "a dance floor-ready track showing Black at her most seductive", and declared that it "announces Black as a rising pop artist".

Black debuted the album's second single, "Look at You", featuring guitarist Bonavega, on December 7, 2022. Black described the song as being about watching a close friend falter and struggle, and described the video as a continuation of the video for "Crumbs". The song was profiled by Clash, which found it to be "a brave statement" as a "sombre, downcast", contrast to the "real thriller" of "Crumbs". Billboard said that the song "gives fans a crisp idea of what to expect from her upcoming debut album", and concluded that "the electric riffs help Black's delicate, airy vocals hit home".

A third single, titled "Sick to My Stomach", was released on the January 18, 2023. Black describes the song as being about the devastation that comes from "the punch in the gut that comes with the revelation that you're no longer the center of someone's universe". BroadwayWorld described the track as delving into "the complexity of moving on" and called it "heartfelt". Their review further said that this song, "Crumbs and "Look at You", "showcase Rebecca Black's versatility as an artist and of the project". The Manchester Evening News said of the song, "[f]eaturing an 80s-esque rhythm, this track really wouldn't sound out of place in a coming-of-age film". Euphoria described "Sick to My Stomach" as "making waves and cementing her spot as one of the most promising pop stars to keep an eye on for 2023", and praised the diversity of singles released for the album.

== Critical reception ==
Professional ratings
Aggregate scores
Source	Rating
Metacritic	68/100
Review scores
Source	Rating
DIY	4/5 stars
NME	4/5 stars
Pitchfork	4.4/10

At Metacritic, which assigns a weighted mean rating out of 100 to reviews from mainstream critics, the album received an average score of 68, based on five reviews, indicating "generally favorable reviews". Following its release, the album was described as "getting solid marks from critics and fans alike". NME rated it 4/5 and said it pushed the boundaries and expectations of pop music. DIY also rated the album 4/5, describing it as "a compelling pop cocktail soundtracking Rebecca's self-discovery". The Associated Press called the album's tracklist an "eclectic range from power pop ballads to electro-pop dance songs". Them described the album as "an unbridled and confident debut" and "a bold genre-melding patchwork whose vibes zig-zag at breakneck speed".

A contrary opinion was provided by Shaad D'Souza of Pitchfork, who wrote that Black has reinvented herself as a "desperate hyperpop star" to "shed the stigma of 'Friday'" and called it "one of the most joyless and interminably dull pop records of the past few years" with only "flashes of a slightly more interesting album" present. He did, however, compliment "Destroy Me", "Sick to My Stomach" and "Look at You", claiming that the latter two "will satiate anyone holding out for The Loneliest Time Side B."

Jason Lipshutz, writing for Billboard, listed the track "Misery Loves Company" as one of "10 Cool New Pop Songs to Get You Through The Week", writing that Black "sounds remarkably confident on new album Let Her Burn, and that self-assured approach yields sleek, fully realized pop gems". He described the song as having "an ultra-cool hyperpop approach" and deemed it "an impressive showcase on multiple levels, and a worthy playlist addition".

In May 2023, following Black's concert tour debut in Boston, Melodic described the album as "a stellar body of work that sees her living her true authentic self". In the lead-up to Black's concert tour date in Chicago later that month, that city's Chicago Reader described the album as "31 minutes of hyperpop that reveals someone grappling with the desire to say something sincere after being a notorious online punching bag for more than a decade", stating that "[w]hat the album lacks in ambition and ingenuity, it makes up for with self-awareness". The piece further noted that Black "never adopted a persona that leans hard on the hypersexual", instead finding her "fairly restrained by pop-icon standards".

In June 2023, Billboard listed the album as one of the top 50 albums of the year so far, describing it as "10 tracks of smart, detailed and timely-but-not-trendy pop music, bursting at the seams with hooks and ideas and tied together with the nervy energy of an artistic voice determined to prove itself worth paying attention to". The review called out the song "Performer" as the "most arresting" song on the album, describing it as a "heartbreaking closer" and a "fragile ballad".

== Track listing ==
The track listing was released on January 18, 2023.

Let Her Burn track listing
No.	Title	Writer(s)	Producer(s)	Length
1.	"Erase You"	Rebecca Black; David Charles Fischer; Micah Jasper	Jasper; Stint	3:17
2.	"Destroy Me"	Black; Ajay Bhattacharyya; Fischer	Stint	3:02
3.	"Misery Loves Company"	Black; Fischer; Jasper	Jasper	2:49
4.	"Crumbs"	Black; Matias Mora; Jesse Saint John	Mora	3:13
5.	"Doe Eyed"	Black; Oscar Scheller	Jasper; Scheller	2:35
6.	"Sick to My Stomach"	Black; Fischer; Jasper; Ceci Gomez	Ceci G; Jasper	4:14
7.	"What Am I Gonna Do with You"	Black; Gomez; Kevin Hissink	Ceci G; Hissink	2:38
8.	"Cry Hard Enough"	Black; Fischer; Jasper; Laurence Lafond-Beaulne; Camille Poliquin	Jasper	2:49
9.	"Look at You"	Black; Amy Allen; Gian Stone	Jasper; Stone; Lionel Crasta	2:44
10.	"Performer"	Black; Jasper; Lauren Aquilina	Jasper	3:14
Total length:				30:35

== "Let Her Burn Tour" dates ==
Date	City	Country	Venue
February 4, 2023	Dublin	Ireland	Green Room – The Academy
February 6, 2023	Glasgow	Scotland	Warehouse SWG3
February 7, 2023	Manchester	England	Gorilla
February 8, 2023	Birmingham	England	O2 Academy
February 10, 2023	London	England	Heaven
February 11, 2023	Bristol	England	Thekla
May 4, 2023	Cambridge	United States	The Sinclair
May 5, 2023	Philadelphia	United States	The Foundry
May 6, 2023	Brooklyn	United States	The Hall, Elsewhere
May 9, 2023	Montreal	Canada	Théâtre Fairmount
May 10, 2023	Toronto	Canada	Axis Club
May 12, 2023	Chicago	United States	Bottom Lounge
May 14, 2023	Saint Paul	United States	Amsterdam Bar & Hall
May 16, 2023	Denver	United States	Marquis Theater
May 17, 2023	Salt Lake City	United States	Soundwell
May 19, 2023	San Francisco	United States	The Independent
May 20, 2023	Los Angeles	United States	El Rey Theatre
June 23, 2023	Brooklyn	United States	Ladyland Festival (Note: Supporting Honey Dijon and Peaches.)
July 2, 2023	London	England	Hyde Park (Note: Supporting Blackpink, along with Sabrina Carpenter, The Rose, Caity Baser, and others.)
July 20, 2023	Vancouver	Canada	Sound Club
July 21, 2023	Seattle	United States	Capitol Hill Block Party
July 22, 2023	Portland	United States	Hawthorne Theatre
August 25, 2023	Syracuse	United States	New York State Fair
