= My Moment (Rebecca Black song) =

Single by Rebecca Black
- Released: July 19, 2011
- Genre: Teen pop; bubblegum pop; dance-pop
- Length: 3:25
- Label: Self-released
- Songwriters: Brandon Hamilton, Quinton Tolbert
- Producers: Brandon Hamilton, Quinton Tolbert, Charlton Pettus

Rebecca Black singles chronology
"Friday" (2011)	"My Moment" (2011)	"Person of Interest" (2011)

Music video
- "My Moment" on YouTube

"My Moment" is a song by American singer Rebecca Black. It is a self-empowerment follow-up song to her first single "Friday", addressed to the "haters" who criticized her previous release. The song was written and produced by Brandon "Blue" Hamilton and Quinton Tolbert, and co-produced by Charlton Pettus. It was independently released exclusively to YouTube, the iTunes Store and Amazon MP3 on July 19, 2011, after disputes over ownership and distribution with Ark Music Production on her previous single, "Friday".

"My Moment" received mostly negative reviews from music critics. Though reviewers considered it an improvement from Black's previous single, they also found it less enjoyable. Unlike its predecessor, the song failed to chart on international music markets. The song's music video, which premiered a day before the single was released, portrays Black's "sudden rise to fame" and her "moments". The video garnered over a million views on YouTube within 24 hours of its release.

== Background ==
Rebecca Black became famous in early 2011 for her song "Friday" and its viral music video, whose reception was heavily negative from commentators and YouTube users. Black said that, after "Friday", she needed "to find the perfect song that kind of tells off the haters a little bit but still shows that [she is] a serious artist." "My Moment" was written and produced by Brandon "Blue" Hamilton and Quinton Tolbert, and co-produced by Charlton Pettus. The single release was first announced on July 11, 2011. Two days later, Black unveiled the single's artwork through her Twitter account. On July 18, the accompanying music video was uploaded on Black's YouTube channel, while the single was released digitally on the iTunes Store on July 19.

== Composition ==
"My Moment"
A sample of the song's chorus.

"My Moment" is a self-empowerment song that lasts for three minutes and twenty-five seconds. According to Jocelyn Vena of MTV, the song "is addressing all those haters who didn't necessarily get her last viral smash, "Friday". Black starts singing the lyrics "Weren't you the one who said that I would be nothing? / Well, I'm about to prove you wrong / I'm not the only one who believes in something / My one wish is about to come true." As the song goes, Black addresses her negative reception even more, singing, "Haters, said I'll see you later/Can't talk to you right now/I'm getting my paper". "My Moment" features a simple mid-tempo melody with a prominent uses of garish keyboards on its background. Uses of pitch-correcting software Auto-Tune on Black's vocals were also noticed.

== Critical reception ==
Tanner Stransky of Entertainment Weekly said that, unlike Black's previous song, "My Moment" was not so bad it's good, and Michelle Woo of OC Weekly described "My Moment" as "a lot less terrible" than "Friday", making it "less awesome". Many compared the production to that of "Friday". Mike Hale of The New York Times criticized Black's vocals for being "as heavily processed" as they were previously, but said that the tuning had "been done much more artfully", meaning Black sounded "more like a human being." A reviewer for The Huffington Post said, "if you were hoping for "Friday" part two, this certainly isn't it. Gone is the weird nasal, overly auto-tuned voice that made 'Friday' sound like she was saying 'fried egg.'" Black herself was called "sweet but very self empowered" by Stransky, and Adrian Chen of Gawker called the track "a 'look-at-me-now' love letter" to all [Black's] haters". Jason Lipshutz of Billboard saw the song in a similar light; for him, Black "does offer a bit of vitriol to those who wrote her off as a one-hit Internet wonder."

The song was compared to Radio Disney songs and the music of Justin Bieber. While Chen called it "inoffensive" and "mildly catchy", other reviewers were less sympathetic. Jenni Dunning, of the Toronto Star, said that while "you might find it possible to listen to the whole song without flinching as much at her nasally voice [...] that doesn’t make it good." Daniel Kreps, of Yahoo! Music, was even more critical, saying that nobody could like "My Moment", not even ironically.

== Music video ==
The music video, directed by Morgan Lawley, was released through Black's YouTube channel on July 18, 2011, and a behind-the-scenes video was uploaded the day after. The video opens with Black in a studio, finishing the song recording with a studio band: guitarist Kellen McGee, bassist Jeremy Steel, and keyboardist Jourdan Steel. The video intercuts scenes of the studio with footage of Black making TV appearances, walking on red carpets, driving around Hollywood and greeting fans. Next, the singer is seen on a makeup chair and rehearsing several dance steps. She then starts the full choreography with So You Think You Can Dance finalists Robert Roldan and Kent Boyd. So You Think You Can Dance's Allison Holker and Lauren Gottlieb also appear in the dance sections of the video. The video ends with Black at the premiere of My Moment, a fictional film about her.

Black has stated that her favorite part of making the video was the dancing; she used to be a dancer and is a regular watcher of So You Think You Can Dance. In less than twenty-four hours after its release, the video had already attracted one million views on YouTube. Nicole James of MTV said that, in the music video, Black is "definitely a little sassier than the "Friday" singer we once knew", while Mike Hale of The New York Times noted that "a lot of people will rip “My Moment” for its relentless self-celebration."

== Credits and personnel ==
Credits for "My Moment" adapted from MTV and CNN.

- Rebecca Black – lead vocals, backing vocals
- Brandon "Blue" Hamilton – songwriting, production
- Quinton Tolbert – songwriting, production
- Charlton Pettus – production
