= Saturday (Rebecca Black and Dave Days song) =

Single by Rebecca Black and Dave Days
- Released: December 3, 2013
- Recorded: 2013
- Genre: Pop
- Length: 3:47
- Label: RB Records; Relica Music Group

Rebecca Black singles chronology
"In Your Words" (2012)	"Saturday" (2013)	"The Great Divide" (2016)

Dave Days singles chronology
"Saturday" (2013)

Audio sample
- Rebecca Black and Dave Days - "Saturday": file; help

Music video
- "Saturday" on YouTube

"Saturday" is a song by American singer Rebecca Black and American musician and YouTube personality Dave Days. The single was released on December 3, 2013, with its accompanying music video released the following Saturday, December 7. It acts as a follow-up to her first single "Friday", which is parodied in the music video and lyrics.

== Critical reception ==
The video received mixed reviews. James Montgomery from MTV said that "Saturday" is "everything you'd imagine", but cited her mature side poking through. Lauren Ziegler from The Sydney Morning Herald called it a "bold move" for Black to make "Saturday". Drew Grant from The New York Observer called the video her most mature work yet, but went on to say that she is reflecting on her past: "Yet beneath the perky chords lies a refrain of sadness, as if Ms. Black already knows that by the time ‘Sunday’ roles [sic] around, she will no longer have any weekend left to which [sic] to live for." Kevin Rutherford from Billboard also mentioned her maturity, saying she is "more sure of herself", and calling the song a "passable piece of Radio Disney-esque pop". Rutherford further commented that the video "deserves the brunt of the attention" due to all of the "Friday" references. While praised for her maturity, Black also stirred racial controversy by having a black male arrested at the end of the music video. Nardine Saad of the Los Angeles Times cited the alleged racism: "At the end, the only prominent African-American in the video gets arrested, which has drawn accusations of racism against Black. It's unclear who it is or why he's getting arrested, and, unlike Ms. Black, we just want it all to end."

Despite jokes about a possible "Sunday" in the future, Black herself has said that she is "done with weekdays" and that "Saturday" is her last song named after a day of the week.

== Chart performance ==
"Saturday" debuted and peaked at number 55 on the US Billboard Hot 100, surpassing "Friday" as her highest charting single and selling 3,000 downloads in its first week of sales.

== Live performance ==
Rebecca Black performed "Saturday" live at DigiFest New York City on June 8, 2014.

== Charts ==
Chart (2013)	Peak position
US Billboard Hot 100	55
