= Rebecca Black =

American YouTuber, singer, songwriter, and DJ (born 1997)

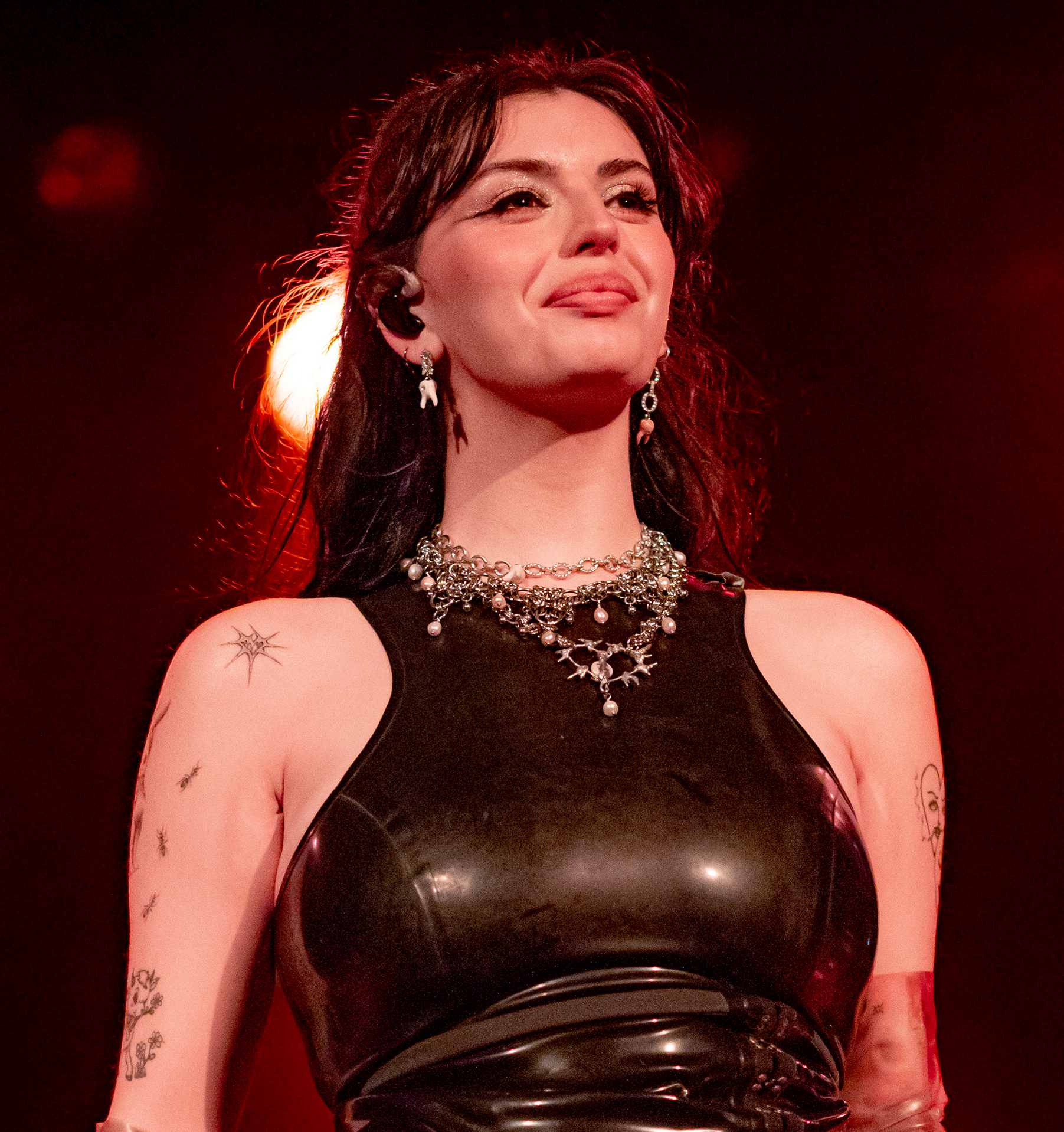
- Black in 2023

Background information
- Born: Rebecca Renee Black; June 21, 1997 (age 29); Irvine, California, U.S.
- Genre: Pop
- Occupations: Singer; songwriter; YouTuber
- Instrument: Vocals
- Years active: 2011–present
- Labels: ARK Music Factory; RB
- Publisher: Downtown Music Holdings
- Website: rebeccablack.co

YouTube information
- Channel: rebecca
- Subscribers: 1.57 million
- Views: 297 million
- Last updated: September 15, 2026

Rebecca Renee Black (born June 21, 1997) is an American singer, songwriter and YouTuber. She gained extensive media coverage when the music video for her 2011 debut single "Friday" went viral on YouTube and various social media sites. The song peaked at number 58 on the Billboard Hot 100. It received an overwhelmingly negative response from audiences and music critics, many of whom considered it among the worst songs of all time. In 2013, Black released a follow-up single "Saturday" (with Dave Days) to similar commercial success and marginally improved reception.

Her debut studio album, Let Her Burn, was released in February 2023 to generally favorable reviews. It was preceded by two extended plays (EPs); the second, Rebecca Black Was Here (2021), marked a change in her sound. In 2025, she released her third EP Salvation. Her second studio album, Age of the Exhibitionist, was released in 2026.

== Early life ==
Rebecca Renee Black was born on June 21, 1997, in Irvine, California. She is the daughter of John Jeffery Black and Georgina Marquez Kelly, both veterinarians. Her mother is a Mexican immigrant, and her father, originally from Iowa, is of English, Italian, and Polish descent.

Black attended private school from kindergarten to 6th grade, and moved to a public school due to bullying. She joined the school's musical theater program, where she felt she was "meant to be".

In April 2011, Black dropped out in favor of homeschooling, and wanted to focus on her career. Black has said that she was also failing English class due to her busy schedule.

== Career ==
=== 2010–2011: "Friday" ===
In late 2010, a classmate of Black and music video client of Los Angeles record label ARK Music Factory told her about the company. Black's mother paid $4,000 for ARK Music to produce the music video while the Blacks retained ownership of both the master and the video. ARK asked Black to choose between two pre-written tracks: "Super Woman," which was deemed as "too adult," and "Friday", the latter of which being released on YouTube and iTunes. The song's video was uploaded to YouTube on February 10, 2011, and received approximately 1,000 views in the first month. The video went viral on March 11, acquiring millions of views on YouTube in a matter of days, becoming the most discussed topic on social networking site Twitter, and garnering mostly negative media coverage. The single was released on March 14, with first-week sales estimated to be around 40,000 by Billboard. It was later certified Platinum by RIAA in 2026. On March 22, Black appeared on The Tonight Show with Jay Leno, during which she performed the song and discussed the negative reaction to it. The song peaked on the Billboard Hot 100 and the New Zealand Singles Chart at numbers 58 and 33, respectively. In the UK, the song debuted at number 61 on the UK Singles Chart. In response to the YouTube video of "Friday", Black began to receive phone and email death threats, which were investigated by the Anaheim Police Department. Black teamed up with Funny or Die on April Fools' Day 2011 (when the comedy site was renamed Friday or Die) for a series of videos, including one about the underage teens driving a car in her "Friday" video. She signed to manager Debra Baum's DB Entertainment, reportedly with Ryan Seacrest's help.

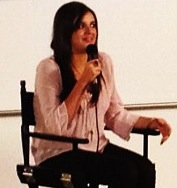
Black in 2011

Black stated that she was a fan of Justin Bieber and expressed interest in performing a duet with him. MTV selected Black to host its first online awards show, the O Music Awards Fan Army Party, in April 2011. As an homage to "Friday", Black appeared in the music video for Katy Perry's "Last Friday Night (T.G.I.F.)", in which Black plays alongside Perry as the hostess of a party Perry attends. A cover version of "Friday" was performed on Glee in the second-season episode, "Prom Queen". When asked about why the song was covered on Glee, show creator Ryan Murphy replied, "The show pays tribute to pop culture and, love it or hate it, that song is pop culture."

With more than 167 million views and more than 3,190,000 "dislikes" during its first four months, prior to its temporary removal, "Friday" was revealed as YouTube's No. 1 video of 2011, with Black hosting a short segment of YouTube Rewind.

Not long after the "Friday" video went viral on YouTube, Black and her mother, Georgina Kelly, got into legal issues with ARK Music over rights to the song. In a letter from Kelly's lawyer to ARK Music on March 29, 2011, it was alleged that ARK Music failed to fulfill the terms of their November 2010 agreement by not giving her the song and video's master recordings, by claiming Black as exclusively signed to the label, and by exploiting the song without permission – for example, selling a "Friday" ringtone. While Ark founder (and "Friday" co-writer) Patrice Wilson stated that Kelly "will get the masters and the song [...] [t]hey can have it all", and agreed that Black was not exclusive to Ark, his attorney claimed that Ark owns the copyright for the song and the November agreement is invalid. In June 2011, ARK Music Factory started charging $2.99 (equivalent to $4.28 in 2025) to watch the music video on YouTube. Later that month, "Friday" was removed as a result of the legal dispute; it was restored to YouTube on September 16, 2011, on Black's official channel. After the fallout with ARK Music Factory, Black started an independent record label named RB Records.

=== 2011–2015: Early songs and covers ===
Black released a self-produced single titled "My Moment" on July 18, 2011, the first on her label, with an accompanying music video published to her YouTube channel the same day. In the video, director Morgan Lawley features real life footage of Black from both before and after the popularization of "Friday". In late October 2011, production began on the music video for Black's third single, "Person of Interest". About the song, Black stated "The basis of it is that it's a love song but it's not a love song. It's about almost teenage crushes – when you're not in love yet but you really like a guy – which I'm really excited about because I don't think there are too many out like that. It's very much a dance type song. It will make you get up and dance and sing along in your car." The single and its accompanying music video were released on November 15, 2011. Black released two more singles in 2012: "Sing It" in May, and "In Your Words" in November. Black was planning to release her debut studio album in late 2011, which she said would include "a bunch of different kinds of stuff." The album was being recorded at a studio belonging to music producer Charlton Pettus. However, the album was never released. Black was featured in an ABC Primetime Nightline: Celebrity Secrets special entitled Underage and Famous: Inside Child Stars' Lives.

In 2012, Black signed onto the Maker Studios YouTube network. She was also brought to Australia by Telstra to promote the launch of their 4G service. Zeitgeist, which sorted billions of Google searches to capture the year's 10 fastest-rising global queries, listed Black as "#1 Most Searched – Google". The searches for the teen singer topped even those of pop icons Lady Gaga and Adele. In late 2013, Black released the song "Saturday". For her sequel to "Friday", she collaborated with Dave Days. It became Black's second song to chart on the Billboard Hot 100, peaking at number 55. While it reached a higher position than "Friday" (number 58), "Saturday" was on the chart only one week, compared to six for "Friday". Aside from her original music, Black has been posting videos regularly on her YouTube channel, which include blogs (sometimes with other people on YouTube), question-and-answer videos, and occasional covers of songs by other artists. This includes her versions of two Miley Cyrus songs from 2013. That July, Black collaborated with fellow YouTube personality Jon D in an acoustic cover of "We Can't Stop", for which lyrical changes were made. Black followed with an acoustic version of "Wrecking Ball" in November.

At VidCon 2015, Black revealed that she had been working on a studio album which she hoped to release by the end of 2015. According to her, the album would not be anything like her previous songs. She had been working on the album since releasing her song "Friday"; however, but it took her a while to be free from ARK Music Factory and find producers with whom she was comfortable. However, no album or new original songs were released. Towards the end of 2015, Black performed a cover of "Wild" by Troye Sivan. Black created a web video in January 2016 on go90 called "Life After Friday". In the show, Black graduates from high school, tells her parents she is not going to college and follows her adventures after moving to Los Angeles.

=== 2016–2020: RE / BL ===
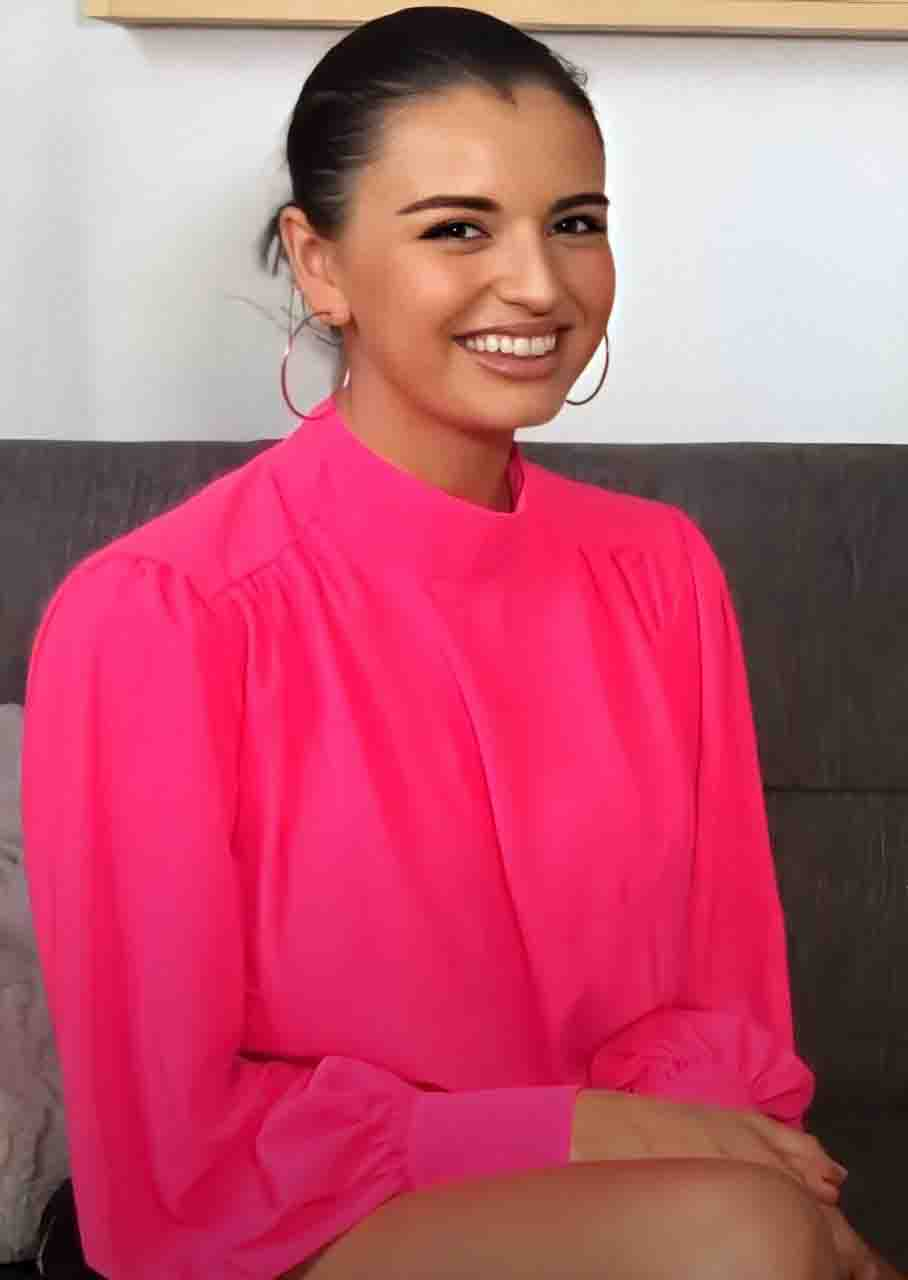
Black in 2019

On August 26, 2016, Black released a new single titled "The Great Divide", her first release of new material in almost three years. This single was the last of her songs to make the charts, which was achieved at No. 23 under the "US Dance" category. Black came out with two more singles in the following year, which included "Foolish" on April 21, 2017, and "Heart Full of Scars" on September 1, 2017. She then released an EP on September 15, 2017, titled RE / BL, which included these two songs as well as "The Great Divide". In June 2018, she appeared on BBC Radio 5 talking about cyberbullying, the adverse effects online attacks had on her and how cruel comments "stick with you forever". Black released the final single from RE / BL, titled "Satellite", on June 4, 2018.

On June 7, 2018, Black appeared as a contestant in season 2 of the reality television musical competition series The Four: Battle for Stardom, broadcast on Fox. The series is hosted by Fergie and judged by Sean Combs, Meghan Trainor and DJ Khaled. Black sang "Bye Bye Bye" by NSYNC for her audition, and received the go-ahead for the next round with "three blue rings" from all three judges. In the next round, she picked contestant James Graham from the boy band Stereo Kicks as her opponent. Graham performed "A Song for You", followed by Black singing Ednaswap's "Torn". The audience voted on the two performances, preferring to save Graham, with Black being eliminated from the show. After her appearance, she tweeted: "I am just blown away reading your comments and seeing so much support online," she wrote. “Sending all of my love right back to you. Thank you for hearing me, for seeing me. This is just the beginning. Also I don't think I'm gonna sleep at all tonight I'm way too excited."

On National French Fry Day 2018, YouTube personality Miranda Sings, in collaboration with Dunkin' Donuts, released an adapted version of "Friday" titled "Donut Fry Day featuring Rebecca Black", as part of the Donut Fries marketing strategy. Black continued to release singles throughout 2019 and 2020 with the singles "Anyway", "Do You?", "Sweetheart" and "Self Sabotage". In September 2020, Black featured on the Dorian Electra track "Edgelord".

=== 2021–2023: Rebecca Black Was Here and Let Her Burn ===
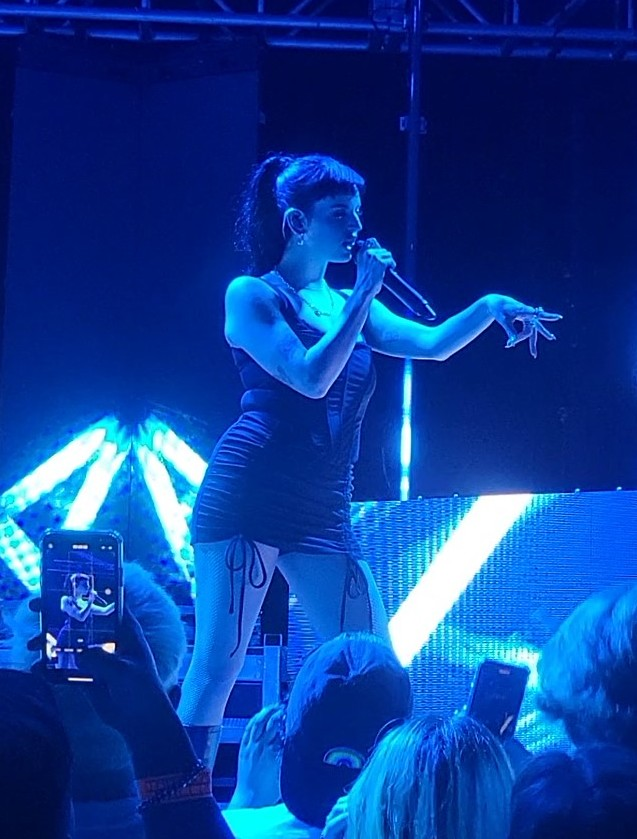
Black performing at the Bowery Ballroom on her 2022 Rebecca Black Was Here tour

On January 29, 2021, Black released the song "Girlfriend". Shortly after, on February 10, 2021, she released a hyperpop remix of "Friday" produced by Dylan Brady of 100 gecs and featuring 3OH!3, Big Freedia and Dorian Electra to commemorate the song's tenth anniversary. After releasing the singles "Personal" and "Worth It for the Feeling", Black announced her second EP, Rebecca Black Was Here, which was released on June 16, 2021.

On November 10, 2022, Black announced her debut studio album, Let Her Burn, for release in early 2023. Four days later, she released the first single from the album, "Crumbs" accompanied by a music video. Critics praised the song, with BrooklynVegan calling it a "hypnotic electropop track". The second single, "Look at You", was released on December 7 and was also well received. On January 6, 2023, Black announced that the album was scheduled for release in the following month, on February 9, 2023. Shortly after, the third and final single, "Sick to My Stomach", was debuted on January 18, 2023. BroadwayWorld noted that the diversity between the singles "showcase[d] Rebecca Black's versatility as an artist and of the project". Let Her Burn was released on February 9, 2023, and was thereafter described as "getting solid marks from critics and fans alike".

Black launched a tour with dates in the UK, North America, and Canada, in support of the album. On June 1, 2023, it was announced that Black would also perform as one of the opening acts for Blackpink, along with Sabrina Carpenter, The Rose, Caity Baser, and others, at British Summer Time in Hyde Park, London.

=== 2024–present: Salvation and Age of the Exhibitionist ===
On September 14, 2024, Black performed a DJ set at Boiler Room, closing with a mashup of "Friday" over Charli XCX's song "360" by felipe.mp3.

In December 2024, Black announced a 2025 tour in support of her third EP, Salvation, which was released on February 27, 2025. The project was originally due out on January 24, but was postponed after the 2025 L.A. fires spread to her hometown.

On March 9, 2025, it was announced that Black would serve as a supporting act for Katy Perry on The Lifetimes Tour. In May 2025, Black was named the official after-party DJ for the American Music Awards.

On June 12, 2026, Black released the single "Speakerphone". On July 10, 2026, she announced her second studio album Age of the Exhibitionist, alongside the release of its second single "Hot Wet Delirious". A tour to promote the album titled "Exhibitionism on Tour" was announced on July 19, 2026. On August 7, 2026, she released "Michael.", the third single from the album. The fourth single, "Anaheim Star", was released on August 31. Age of the Exhibitionist was released on September 4, 2026.

In September 2026, Black was announced as a supporting act on select dates of Hilary Duff's 2027 The Lucky Me Tour.

== Personal life ==
Black has opened up about her struggles with depression as a teenager following the scrutiny of "Friday".

On April 3, 2020, she came out as queer during an episode of the Dating Straight podcast. In February 2025, she told NME: "I don't know how I'm gonna say this without sounding like a twat, but gay is a way of life. Gay is an energy that's so much bigger than how people have used it [negatively]. If you want to get down to specifics, I am queer, I am bi, I am pan – I am all of those [things]. But I am also gay."

== Discography ==
=== Studio albums ===
Title	Details	Peak chart positions
Title	Details	UK DL
Let Her Burn	Released: February 9, 2023; Label: Self-released; Formats: LP, digital download, streaming	—
Age of the Exhibitionist	Released: September 4, 2026; Label: Self-released; Formats: LP, digital download, streaming	75
"—" denotes releases that did not chart or was not released in that territory.

=== Extended plays ===
Title	Details
RE / BL	Released: September 15, 2017; Label: Teall, self-released; Formats: CD, digital download
Rebecca Black (Live Session, Los Angeles, California, 2019)	Released: May 29, 2020; Label: Jam in the Van; Formats: Digital download
Rebecca Black Was Here	Released: June 16, 2021; Label: Self-released; Formats: Digital download
Salvation	Released: February 27, 2025; Label: Self-released; Formats: LP, Digital download, Streaming

=== Singles ===
Title	Year	Peak chart positions									Certifications	Album
Title	Year	US	US Heat	US Dance	AUS Digital	CAN	IRL	NZ	SCO	UK	Certifications	Album
"Friday"	2011	58	1	—	40	61	46	33	45	60	RIAA: Platinum	Non-album singles
"My Moment"	2011	—	—	—	—	—	—	—	—	—		Non-album singles
"Person of Interest"	2011	—	—	—	—	—	—	—	—	—		Non-album singles
"Sing It"	2012	—	—	—	—	—	—	—	—	—		Non-album singles
"In Your Words"	2012	—	—	—	—	—	—	—	—	—		Non-album singles
"Saturday" (with Dave Days)	2013	55	2	—	—	—	—	—	—	—		Non-album singles
"The Great Divide"	2016	—	—	23	—	—	—	—	—	—		RE / BL
"Foolish"	2017	—	—	—	—	—	—	—	—	—		RE / BL
"Heart Full of Scars"	2017	—	—	—	—	—	—	—	—	—		RE / BL
"Anyway"	2019	—	—	—	—	—	—	—	—	—		Non-album singles
"Do You?"	2019	—	—	—	—	—	—	—	—	—		Non-album singles
"Sweetheart"	2019	—	—	—	—	—	—	—	—	—		Non-album singles
"Self Sabotage"	2020	—	—	—	—	—	—	—	—	—		Non-album singles
"Closer"	2020	—	—	—	—	—	—	—	—	—		Non-album singles
"Ven Dímelo (Love Is Love)" (with Dani Ride)	2020	—	—	—	—	—	—	—	—	—		Non-album singles
"Girlfriend"	2021	—	—	—	—	—	—	—	—	—		Rebecca Black Was Here
"Friday (Remix)" (featuring 3OH!3, Big Freedia and Dorian Electra)	2021	—	—	—	—	—	—	—	—	—		Non-album single
"Personal"	2021	—	—	—	—	—	—	—	—	—		Rebecca Black Was Here
"Worth It for the Feeling"	2021	—	—	—	—	—	—	—	—	—		Rebecca Black Was Here
"Read My Mind" (featuring Slayyyter)	2021	—	—	—	—	—	—	—	—	—		Non-album singles
"Heart2" (with umru and Petal Supply)	2022	—	—	—	—	—	—	—	—	—		Non-album singles
"Crumbs"	2022	—	—	—	—	—	—	—	—	—		Let Her Burn
"Look at You"	2022	—	—	—	—	—	—	—	—	—		Let Her Burn
"Sick to My Stomach"	2023	—	—	—	—	—	—	—	—	—		Let Her Burn
"Trust!"	2024	—	—	—	—	—	—	—	—	—		Salvation
"Sugar Water Cyanide"	2024	—	—	—	—	—	—	—	—	—		Salvation
"Salvation"	2025	—	—	—	—	—	—	—	—	—		Salvation
"Speakerphone"	2026	—	—	—	—	—	—	—	—	—		Age of the Exhibitionist
"Hot Wet Delirious"	2026	—	—	—	—	—	—	—	—	—		Age of the Exhibitionist
"Michael."	2026	—	—	—	—	—	—	—	—	—		Age of the Exhibitionist
"Anaheim Star"	2026	—	—	—	—	—	—	—	—	—		Age of the Exhibitionist
"—" denotes releases that did not chart or were not released in that territory.

=== Music videos ===
List of music videos, showing year released and director
Title	Year	Director	Notes
"Friday"	2011	Patrice Wilson and Clarence Jey	
"Last Friday Night (T.G.I.F.)"	2011	Marc Klasfeld	Guest appearance only; Katy Perry's music video
"My Moment"	2011	Morgan Lawley	
"Person of Interest"	2011	Mazik Self	
"Sing It"	2012	Ryan Pesecky	
"In Your Words"	2012	Ryan Pesecky	
"Saturday"	2013	Chris Grieder	
"The Great Divide" (Crash Cove Remix)	2016	Taljon DeRuiter	
"If We Were a Song"	2017		
"Foolish"	2017	Lobster Bear	
"Heart Full of Scars"	2017	Garrett Nicholson	
"Satellite"	2018	Jesse Dacri, Emily Skeggs and Zach Williams	
"Anyway"	2019	Garrett Nicholson	
"Do You?"	2019	Bia Jurema	
"Sweetheart"	2019	Bia Jurema	
"Ass Like Mine"	2020	Brad Hammer	Guest appearance only; Morgan McMichaels's music video
"Alone Together"	2020		
"Edgelord"	2020	Dorian Electra and Weston Allen	Featured; Dorian Electra's music video
"Friday (Remix)"	2021	Weston Allen	
"Yoga"	2021	Shiraz and Mike	Featured; bbno$'s music video
"Crumbs"	2022	Luke Orlando	
"Look at You"	2022	Luke Orlando	
"Sick to My Stomach"	2023	Christina Bryson	
"Trust!"	2024	Olivia De Camps	
"Sugar Water Cyanide"	2024	Rebecca Black, Buck Andrews, Kelsi Franzino, Jack Kolbe and Audrey Lipsmire	
"Salvation"	2025	Olivia De Camps	
"Speakerphone"	2026	Hannah De Vries	
"Hot Wet Delirious"	2026	Hannah De Vries and Rebecca Black	
"Michael."	2026	Rebecca Black and Sabra Binder	

== Tours ==
- Let Her Burn Tour (2023)
- The Salvation Tour (2025)
- Exhibitionism on Tour (2026–2027)

Supporting act

- Katy Perry - The Lifetimes Tour (2025)
- Hilary Duff - The Lucky Me Tour (2027)

== Filmography ==
Year	Title	Role	Type	Notes
2012	Katy Perry: Part of Me	Herself	Film	Documentary
2013	Legend of a Rabbit	Penny	Film	Voice (English dub)
2014	Fine Brothers	Herself	Web series	YouTubers React session (Season 3)
2016	Life After Friday	Herself	Web series	
2022	Is It Cake?	Herself	Netflix series	Episode 5

== Awards and nominations ==
Year	Nominated work	Event	Award	Result	Ref.
2011	"Which Seat Can I Take?"	MTV O Music Awards	Favorite Animated GIF	Nominated	
2011	Herself	Teen Choice Award	Choice Web Star	Won	
2022	Rebecca Black Was Here	Libera Award	Self-Released Record of the Year	Nominated	
