= Clarence Jey =

American record producer and songwriter

- Born: Clarence Ranjith Jeyaretnam; Sri Lanka
- Genre: Pop
- Labels: Ark; Pop-U-Lar; Music Intersection
- Website: clarencejey.com

Clarence Ranjith Jeyaretnam, known professionally as Clarence Jey, is a Sri Lankan-born American record producer and songwriter. He co-founded ARK Music Factory with record producer Patrice Wilson in 2010. The label signed American singer Rebecca Black; Jey and Wilson wrote and produced her 2011 single "Friday", which peaked at number 58 on the Billboard Hot 100.

== Life and career ==
Jey spent some of his childhood in Australia, performing with local bands and composing and producing music at his studio in Melbourne where he wrote and produced the theme song and additional music for the Discovery Kids animation television show, Growing Up Creepie. He then relocated to Los Angeles, California. Upon his relocation, he produced music for guitarist Richie Kotzen. He has since composed music and written songs for television shows including Lego City Adventures, Common Law, America's Got Talent, Randy Jackson Presents America's Best Dance Crew and The Newsroom. Jey's songs and music have been used on commercials including the US retailer Kohls and in Vodafone ads. Jey oversaw a contestant on the 2015 reality show Famous in 12 for The CW.

Jey has also worked in film. In 2014, he produced and composed songs, and was music supervisor for the film Full Love, directed by Jean-Claude Van Damme, which premiered at the Shanghai International Film Festival.

In 2015, Jey produced for R&B group All-4-One on their eighth studio album, Twenty+, which was released in July 2015. In 2016, Jey composed music and wrote lyrics for the musical theater show "Jambalaya The Musical", along with his production partner, American songwriter Jeff Barry. Clarence Jey was involved in part of the music in the Hallmark Channel movie titled My Christmas Love, as well as Australian TV comedy series Please Like Me.

In 2018, Jey produced a song titled "Wasted" on New Zealand roots reggae band Katchafire's album Legacy, which debuted at number 3 on US Billboard Reggae Album Chart.

In 2019, Jey partnered with writer Jeff Barry and composed and wrote a song for Lego City Adventures, an animated television series, produced by The Lego Group, for Nickelodeon television.

In 2023, Jey worked and produced with Canadian Idol Finalist Oliver Pigott's debut American Single, "Eyes My Daddy Gave Me", and co-wrote Noah Floersh second single, "Thompson's Station".

In 2024, Jey co-wrote American Rapper and YouTuber NLE Choppa’s Holiday single “What A Christmas”, which was released via Warner Records.

=== "Friday" ===
In 2011, Jey was part of ARK Music Factory and was involved in the creation of the song "Friday", by Rebecca Black, Jey co-wrote and produced the controversial song, which reached the Billboard Hot 100 and iTunes Top 20 in March 2011.

== Awards ==
In 2017, Jey won the "Tamil American Pioneer" award, an award which recognizes North American Tamil Pioneers in certain fields by the Federation of Tamil Sangams of North America, an organization of the North American Tamil community.
