= Sing It =

Single by Rebecca Black
- Released: May 8, 2012
- Genre: Pop rock
- Length: 2:41
- Label: RB Records

Rebecca Black singles chronology
"Person of Interest" (2011)	"Sing It" (2012)	"In Your Words" (2012)

Audio sample
- Rebecca Black - "Sing It": file; help

Music video
- "Sing It" on YouTube

"Sing It" is a song by American singer Rebecca Black. It was released on the iTunes Store under the label RB Records, as Black's fourth single on May 8, 2012. "Sing It" received mixed to positive reviews from music critics, surprising some due to the song not being modified with the pitch correcting software Auto-Tune that was used in Black's previous singles. The accompanying music video premiered the day before.

== Background ==
On May 2, 2012, Black revealed that she was going to release a single titled "Sing It". Black unveiled the single artwork through her official website. A preview of 30 seconds was posted at YouTube. A studio version leaked via Radio Disney a few days before official premiere. On May 8, 2012, the accompanying music video was uploaded on Black's YouTube channel, with release of the single digitally at iTunes Store.

About the song, Black said: "It's called 'Sing It' and it's very different from past songs I've released. It has a really fun feel to it and is just about letting loose and letting the music take over."

== Critical reception ==
"Sing It" received mixed to positive reviews from music critics. Jamie Peck of Crushable said that the song was a "decent approximation of teen pop music", but that it would never reach the levels of Kelly Clarkson. Peck added that, "Some better producers, better lyrics, and better singing later, we’ve got a song that’s too good to be funny, but not good enough to be a bona fide pop hit." Nicole James from MTV.com noted that "Sing it" had improved significantly from Black's prior single "Friday", adding that "It's a genuinely cute pop song sung by a genuinely cute girl. Let's just forget about that whole "Friday" thing and call a truce, shall we?" Hollywood Life called the song "simple, but cute", noting that it was "perfect for Rebecca’s age demographic. Plus it shows off her voice way more than “Friday” and its autotune ever could."

Dusten Carlson of The Inquisitr described the song as having a "slightly more mature and less-nasally sounding Black" and that "Unless it’s been seriously tampered with by a producer, the girl proves she’s got some pipes, at least ones that’ll satisfy the pop-niche she’s going for." Robbie Daw from Idolator said: "... the sunny guitar-pop jam really doesn't seem to employ much Auto Tune at all. Well, maybe only about 45% of her vocals are worked over here with studio wizardry".

== Music video ==
The music video premiered on E! News, May 7, 2012, before becoming available on Black's YouTube channel the next day. It was filmed in Malibu, California and features Black enjoying a summer day on the beach. The teen star is at some point joined by a few of her friends when she goes for a bike ride, and goes to a party at night. Incidentally, the video premiered the same day as former mentor Patrice Wilson released his video for "Happy (The Official Sequel to Friday)".

Robbie Daw from Idolator said of the video: "... the shoestring-budget 'Sing It' video has premiered, and we can report that it’s just what you’d expect from a wholesome kid who’s still two years off from getting their driver’s license — cute sun dresses, flowers in the hair, twirling on the beach and hanging with pals by a campfire". Amy Sciarretto from PopCrush said: "We want her life, or at least the life that plays out in the space of four minutes with this video. It’s such a summer-ready clip and will make you yearn for those long, sun-splashed days outside. Black ultimately ushers in the warm weather season with the sound of her frothy, light, sand-between-your toes jam, too".

== Track listing ==
- Digital download
1. "Sing It" – 2:48

== Release history ==
Digital releases
Region	Date	Format	Label
United States	May 8, 2012	Digital download	RB Records
