= In Your Words =

Single by Rebecca Black
- Released: November 23, 2012
- Genre: Country pop
- Length: 3:06
- Label: RB

Rebecca Black singles chronology
"Sing It" (2012)	"In Your Words" (2012)	"Saturday" (2013)

Audio sample
- The song's chorus.: file; help

Music video
- "In Your Words" on YouTube

"In Your Words" is a song by American singer Rebecca Black. The single was released on November 23, 2012, and the music video was released the same day.

== Composition ==
"In Your Words" is an emotional midtempo acoustic guitar-driven country pop song, where Rebecca Black sings that she is "moving on/Cause you set me free/And I'm trying to be as much of myself as if you were here with me...", after breaking up with somebody. Black explained the song in a 2012 interview:

"In Your Words" is one of those songs that was really different for me…because the song that I released last year, "Person of Interest", was talking about a crush and all of that, but this one is a break up song. We wanted to take it more mature because my sound is becoming more mature. The song is about when you break up with someone and all of a sudden you’re just kind of stuck there. You’re stuck with the texts and everything.

Black has also said that her manager "likes to use a term, which is a pretty good analogy, that it's Taylor Swift without the twang."

== Critical response ==
Joann Pan from Mashable praised Rebecca Black's improved vocals and maturity from her previous releases. She wrote about the single: "The catchy song, set to a more leisurely tempo than her previous releases, may be one for the haters who have criticized her looks, singing and lyrics."

== Music video ==
Rebecca Black as she is seen in the video playing a piano while clear glass walls are filled with marker-drawn text.

Filming for the video was finished in October 2012, and behind-the-scenes photos for the video were released less than a week after the video was done shooting. A teaser of the video was uploaded on November 9, 2012, and the video was officially released the same day as the single. Black said about the video:

The writing on those walls kind of represent everything that it made me feel, and how to let it out; kind of closure; acting out what the words meant and kind of how it makes me feel. There is a point when I’m on the roof of the house reading through letters, and just going through that idea of "the letters in the text."

== Live performances ==
The song was performed live by Rebecca Black for her debut concert at the House of Blues on December 24, 2012.
