= List of number-one digital songs of 2011 (U.S.) =

2011 highest-selling digital singles in the United States

The highest-selling digital singles in the United States are ranked in the Hot Digital Songs chart, published by Billboard magazine. The data are compiled by Nielsen SoundScan based on each single's weekly digital sales, which combines sales of different versions of a single for a summarized figure.

== Chart history ==
Key
| † | Indicates best-charting digital song of 2011 |

| Issue date | Song | Artist(s) | Weekly sales | Ref(s) |
|---|---|---|---|---|
| January 1 | "Grenade" | Bruno Mars | 212,000 | |
| January 8 | "Grenade" | Bruno Mars | 559,000 | |
| January 15 | "Grenade" | Bruno Mars | 425,000 | |
| January 22 | "Grenade" | Bruno Mars | 275,000 | |
| January 29 | "Hold It Against Me" | Britney Spears | 411,000 | |
| February 5 | "Grenade" | Bruno Mars | 204,000 | |
| February 12 | "Fuckin' Perfect" | Pink | 241,000 | |
| February 19 | "I Need a Doctor" | Dr. Dre featuring Eminem and Skylar Grey | 226,000 | |
| February 26 | "Born This Way" | Lady Gaga | 448,000 | |
| March 5 | "Born This Way" | Lady Gaga | 509,000 | |
| March 12 | "Born This Way" | Lady Gaga | 286,000 | |
| March 19 | "Born This Way" | Lady Gaga | 231,000 | |
| March 26 | "E.T." | Katy Perry featuring Kanye West | 216,000 | |
| April 2 | "E.T." | Katy Perry featuring Kanye West | 261,000 | |
| April 9 | "E.T." | Katy Perry featuring Kanye West | 254,000 | |
| April 16 | "E.T." | Katy Perry featuring Kanye West | 327,000 | |
| April 23 | "E.T." | Katy Perry featuring Kanye West | 323,000 | |
| April 30 | "S&M" | Rihanna featuring Britney Spears | 293,000 | |
| May 7 | "E.T." | Katy Perry featuring Kanye West | 344,000 | |
| May 14 | "E.T." | Katy Perry featuring Kanye West | 300,000 | |
| May 21 | "Rolling in the Deep" † | Adele | 294,000 | |
| May 28 | "Rolling in the Deep" † | Adele | 353,000 | |
| June 4 | "Rolling in the Deep" † | Adele | 297,000 | |
| June 11 | "Rolling in the Deep" † | Adele | 254,000 | |
| June 18 | "Rolling in the Deep" † | Adele | 244,000 | |
| June 25 | "Rolling in the Deep" † | Adele | 224,000 | |
| July 2 | "Last Friday Night (T.G.I.F.)" | Katy Perry | 235,000 | |
| July 9 | "Last Friday Night (T.G.I.F.)" | Katy Perry | 226,000 | |
| July 16 | "Party Rock Anthem" | LMFAO featuring Lauren Bennett and GoonRock | 258,000 | |
| July 23 | "Party Rock Anthem" | LMFAO featuring Lauren Bennett and GoonRock | 236,000 | |
| July 30 | "Party Rock Anthem" | LMFAO featuring Lauren Bennett and GoonRock | 215,000 | |
| August 6 | "Party Rock Anthem" | LMFAO featuring Lauren Bennett and GoonRock | 209,000 | |
| August 13 | "Party Rock Anthem" | LMFAO featuring Lauren Bennett and GoonRock | 202,000 | |
| August 20 | "Party Rock Anthem" | LMFAO featuring Lauren Bennett and GoonRock | 185,000 | |
| August 27 | "Moves Like Jagger" | Maroon 5 featuring Christina Aguilera | 219,000 | |
| September 3 | "She Will" | Lil Wayne featuring Drake | 255,000 | |
| September 10 | "Moves Like Jagger" | Maroon 5 featuring Christina Aguilera | 217,000 | |
| September 16 | "Someone Like You" | Adele | 275,000 | |
| September 24 | "Moves Like Jagger" | Maroon 5 featuring Christina Aguilera | 220,000 | |
| October 1 | "Moves Like Jagger" | Maroon 5 featuring Christina Aguilera | 221,000 | |
| October 8 | "Moves Like Jagger" | Maroon 5 featuring Christina Aguilera | 233,000 | |
| October 15 | "Someone Like You" | Adele | 222,000 | |
| October 22 | "Someone Like You" | Adele | 218,000 | |
| October 29 | "Someone Like You" | Adele | 207,000 | |
| November 5 | "We Found Love" | Rihanna featuring Calvin Harris | 231,000 | |
| November 12 | "We Found Love" | Rihanna featuring Calvin Harris | 243,000 | |
| November 19 | "We Found Love" | Rihanna featuring Calvin Harris | 236,000 | |
| November 26 | "We Found Love" | Rihanna featuring Calvin Harris | 227,000 | |
| December 3 | "We Found Love" | Rihanna featuring Calvin Harris | 211,000 | |
| December 10 | "Sexy and I Know It" | LMFAO | 226,000 | |
| December 17 | "It Will Rain" | Bruno Mars | 166,000 | |
| December 24 | "Sexy and I Know It" | LMFAO | 149,000 | |
| December 31 | "Sexy and I Know It" | LMFAO | 152,000 | |

== See also ==
- 2011 in music
- Hot Digital Songs
