= What Does It Take (Dave Days song) =

Single by Dave Days

from the album Dinner and a Movie
- Released: October 18th, 2010
- Recorded: 2010
- Genre: Power pop, pop rock
- Length: 3:28
- Songwriter: Dave Days
- Producer: Dave Days

Dave Days singles chronology
"Olive You (featuring Kimmi Smiles)" (2010)	"What Does It Take" (2010)	"We're Just Kids" (2012)

"What Does It Take" is a song by American singer Dave Days. It served as the third and final single from his 2010 EP Dinner and a Movie. It is one of Dave's most recognizable songs and was also performed on Disney Channel's So Random!.

== Music video ==
The song's music video is set in a high school, where Dave realizes he has gotten the lead part in the school play. Amanda Lynn (Days' interest in the video) sees she has gotten the second lead, and runs to her boyfriend, who ignores her. Days and Lynn begin to practice together, and during rehearsal, she falls, and gets up in slow motion with her hair blowing in the wind, when Dave realizes that's what he is seeing, he snaps out of it and continues to rehearse. Opening night comes around, and Lynn's boyfriend is in the stands, looking disinterested in the play. Days and Lynn begin to dance, and after the dance she walks off. Dave grabs her hand and proceeds to say the lines in the bridge of the song. They then lean in for a kiss, and the boyfriend sends in a gang of people to attack the cast and crew, along with himself. The cast fends off the kids, and its down to the boyfriend and Days. An audience member throws Dave his guitar. Dave blocks a hit from a sword the boyfriend is carrying, and knocks him to the ground by hitting him with the head of the guitar while doing a guitar flip. He then takes the sword he had and puts it to his neck while he is on the ground. The audience then claps, and Days and Lynn hug and wave to the crowd.
