= ARK Music Factory =

American musical composition and production company

Ark Music Factory & Productions, LLC
- Founded: 2010; 16 years ago
- Founder: Patrice Wilson; Clarence Jey
- Defunct: 2012; 14 years ago
- Genre: Teen pop, electropop
- Country of origin: United States
- Location: Los Angeles, California
- Official website: arkmusicfactory.com (defunct)

Ark Music Factory (formerly Ark Music Production) was a musical composition and production company based in Los Angeles, California. The company was co-founded in 2010 by Patrice Wilson, who partnered with producer/composer and multi-instrumentalist Clarence Jey.

In May 2011, Jey left Ark Music Factory to focus on his own production company Music Intersection. Later in 2011, Wilson established a successor record label, Pato Music World (PMW), as a sole proprietorship.

== History ==
Patrice Wilson co-founded Ark Music Factory in 2010; Wilson was also the CEO of the company.

Ark's business centered on the recruitment/discovery of new young singers. The artists paid a $2,000 to $4,000 fee to Ark, and Ark then wrote and produced music in collaboration with the artists, often producing music videos and promotion of the songs. The singer owned the master recording, while Ark retained the publishing rights to the songs and all the sales from the song.

They stated that their main objectives were to bring aspiring acts to the musical fore: "We at Ark make it possible for an emerging artist to be discovered, defined and delivered, to advance in their chosen career and be successful." Ark was predominantly based in the US, although they claimed that artists they had supported have had success in different regions across the globe.

Ark's Facebook page claimed to be creating a community where artists from all fields can come together to build connections and interact. Wilson also rebuffed claims of exploitation, claiming that the company provided a relatively inexpensive entry into the pop market for artists:

"I'm getting a lot of criticism saying I'm exploiting rich kids and their parents," says Wilson, "but find me another company that would do all this at a cost this low. I don't promise anyone fame. In fact, if someone approaches me with their only goal to ‘get famous,' I tell them they're not in this for the right reasons."

The staff of Ark Music Factory included Patrice Wilson (also known with the name Pato for his various acts) who was the founder of the company, CEO and Sri Lankan / Australian record producer, songwriter and co-founder and producer, Clarence Jey. At Ark, Jey wrote the music and Wilson wrote the lyrics. Ian Hotchkiss and Chris Lowe were the video directors.

=== Rebecca Black controversy ===
In March 2011, Ark gained notoriety through a viral video when one of their songs, Rebecca Black's "Friday" (which also includes raps by Wilson) unexpectedly became an Internet meme. According to the British newspaper The Independent, Black trended high on Twitter, after the release. The original video gained 167 million views until June 2011 when it was removed from YouTube due to copyright claims from Black's family. It was reinstated in September 2011 on Black's personal YouTube channel and has been viewed over 178 million times as of January 2026.

Wilson posted two music responses about "Friday" and the controversy it created. The first was posted on March 13, 2011, entitled "Friday (Rap Remix)" written and produced by Wilson and Jey, the second on April 4, 2011, entitled "Say What You Wanna Say" written by Wilson and Kustom. Both songs addressed some of the most common grievances against the song and the way Ark runs its business. Both these postings received negative attention as well.

=== Changes and end ===
In May 2011, Clarence Jey left Ark Music Factory to focus on his own production company Music Intersection. Later in 2011, Patrice Wilson, the other cofounder established Pato Music World (PMW) / PMW Live. He signed a number of acts to his new label, many of whom were ARK Music Factory signings. The company released a "sequel" to Rebecca Black's "Friday" with "Happy" (alternatively "Happy (The Official Sequel to Friday)" or "The H.A.P.P.Y. Song"); it features Antoine Dodson and Lela Brown and focuses on Saturdays, with plenty of remarks to Friday and a self-deprecating music video. Previously, Wilson had also written the song "Tuesday" for Jon Ronson. In November 2012, PMW released "It's Thanksgiving" by Nicole Westbrook, a song written and produced by Wilson.

== Other venues ==
=== One Week to Hit Big: Pop Star ===
Wilson and his Ark Music Factory team appeared in One Week to Hit It Big: Pop Star the ABC (American Broadcasting Company) show Good Morning America (GMA) one-week special feature. After auditions of tens of candidates, Lexi St. George was chosen for the GMA challenge of trying to make a viral star in one week. She recorded the song "Dancing to the Rhythm" written for the show and made a music video that was broadcast on the program on June 30, 2011. The song was also used for Wowwee's Paper Jamz Pro microphones promotional ads.

=== Ark Star ===
Ark Music Factory planned another nationwide online talent search with finalists to be chosen from online submissions, the company said in a statement. The contest named "Ark Star" began on July 22, 2011, offering eligible contestants the chance to win their own custom song, music video, and artist promotion by Ark Music Factory.
