= Last Friday Night (T.G.I.F.) =

2011 single by Katy Perry

Single by Katy Perry

from the album Teenage Dream
- Released: June 6, 2011
- Studio: Conway and eightysevenfourteen (Los Angeles, California); Playback (Santa Barbara, California)
- Genre: Dance-pop; new wave
- Length: 3:50 (Album version); 3:58 (Remix featuring Missy Elliott)
- Label: Capitol
- Songwriters: Katy Perry; Lukasz Gottwald; Max Martin; Bonnie McKee
- Producers: Dr. Luke; Max Martin

Katy Perry singles chronology
"E.T." (2011)	"Last Friday Night (T.G.I.F.)" (2011)	"The One That Got Away" (2011)

Missy Elliott singles chronology
"Get Involved" (2010)	"Last Friday Night (T.G.I.F.)" (remix) (2011)	"Nobody's Perfect" (2012)

Music video
- "Last Friday Night (T.G.I.F.)" on YouTube

"Last Friday Night (T.G.I.F.)" is a song by American singer Katy Perry from her third studio album, Teenage Dream. She and Bonnie McKee co-wrote the song with its producers Dr. Luke and Max Martin. It was recorded at Conway Recording Studios and eightysevenfourteen in Los Angeles, California and Playback Recording Studio in Santa Barbara, California. Perry stated that she was inspired to write the track after a night of wild partying and streaking.

It was released as the album's fifth single on June 6, 2011, by Capitol Records, with a remix featuring American rapper Missy Elliott released to US radio stations and digital retailers on August 8, 2011. The latter version was included in the Teenage Dream reissue, Teenage Dream: The Complete Confection (2012). It is a dance-pop and new wave song with lyrics about drunken fun and debauchery. Some of the risqué lyrics are often censored in radio versions of the song.

The song had chart success worldwide, reaching number one in Canada, Slovakia and the Czech Republic, and has attained top-ten positions in Austria, Ireland, Italy, and Poland. When it topped the US Billboard Hot 100, Perry became the first female solo artist to have five number-one singles on the Hot 100 from a single album; it also was Perry's sixth number-one single on the Billboard Hot 100 chart, and her fifth consecutive number one single. The single has sold 3.8 million digital copies in the US and was the tenth most played single on US radio during 2011.It has currently surpassed 2 billion streams on Spotify.

The song's accompanying music video was directed by Marc Klasfeld. The clip features Perry, as her teenage alter-ego Kathy Beth Terry, at a house party filled with music and dancing. While at the party, Terry is made over by her friend and draws attention to herself as the life of the party. Rebecca Black, Corey Feldman, Debbie Gibson, Kenny G, Hanson, Kevin McHale, and Darren Criss all appear in the video. According to the director, the inspiration behind the video was Sixteen Candles, works by American filmmaker John Hughes, and other 1980s high school films. The music video won Favorite Music Video award at the 38th People's Choice Awards.

== Background and artwork ==
Perry has revealed that she was inspired to write the track after running naked through a park with her friends. According to Music Rooms, Perry claims that after a wild night of partying and streaking, she wrote the song about her antics and what she remembered the next day. Perry revealed: "There's nothing better than an impromptu dance party with my friends. My track 'Last Friday Night (T.G.I.F.)' is a song about debauchery because I had one of those nights in Santa Barbara. We went out to this place called Wildcat and got crazy," Perry admitted: "We had a couple of beers and danced until we died, then brought the party back to the hotel room." She added: "Most of that song is actual truth, apart from the ménage à trois..... unfortunately! But, yes, streaking in the park, that's what we did, so we had to write a song about it the next day!"

One of the friends in this trip was co-writer Bonnie McKee, who said the song encapsulated "Katy and my wild drinking days" from their younger days. McKee stated "TGIF is pretty much a word for word description of our trip to Santa Barbara, so I love that one. It's really catchy and fun and makes me nostalgic." The official artwork for "Last Friday Night (T.G.I.F.)" using scenes from the music video, shows Perry both before and after a makeover. She revealed the cover artwork for "Last Friday Night (T.G.I.F.) Remixes!" on her Facebook page. The photo features Perry in nerdy gear, including mouth guard and glasses, and was taken when she hosted the Teen Choice Awards in summer 2010. The image is surrounded by 1980s-style neon colors and swirly graphics. A remixed version of "Last Friday Night (T.G.I.F.)", featuring Missy Elliott, was released on August 8, 2011, to radio and as a digital download. It was released as the album's fifth single on June 6, 2011, through Capitol Records.

== Composition ==
"Last Friday Night (T.G.I.F.)" is a dance-pop and new wave song, with elements of indie rock, which runs for three minutes and 50 seconds. It is set in common time and has a moderate tempo of 126 beats per minute. It can be notated in the key of F♯ major or G♭ major, and Perry's vocals span a ninth, from C♯_{4} to D♯_{5} (or D♭_{4} to E♭_{5}). It uses the chord progression B – G♯m7 – D♯m7 – C♯ (or C♭ – A♭m7 – E♭m7 – D♭) throughout and ends on the tonic (F♯ or G♭).

== Critical reception ==
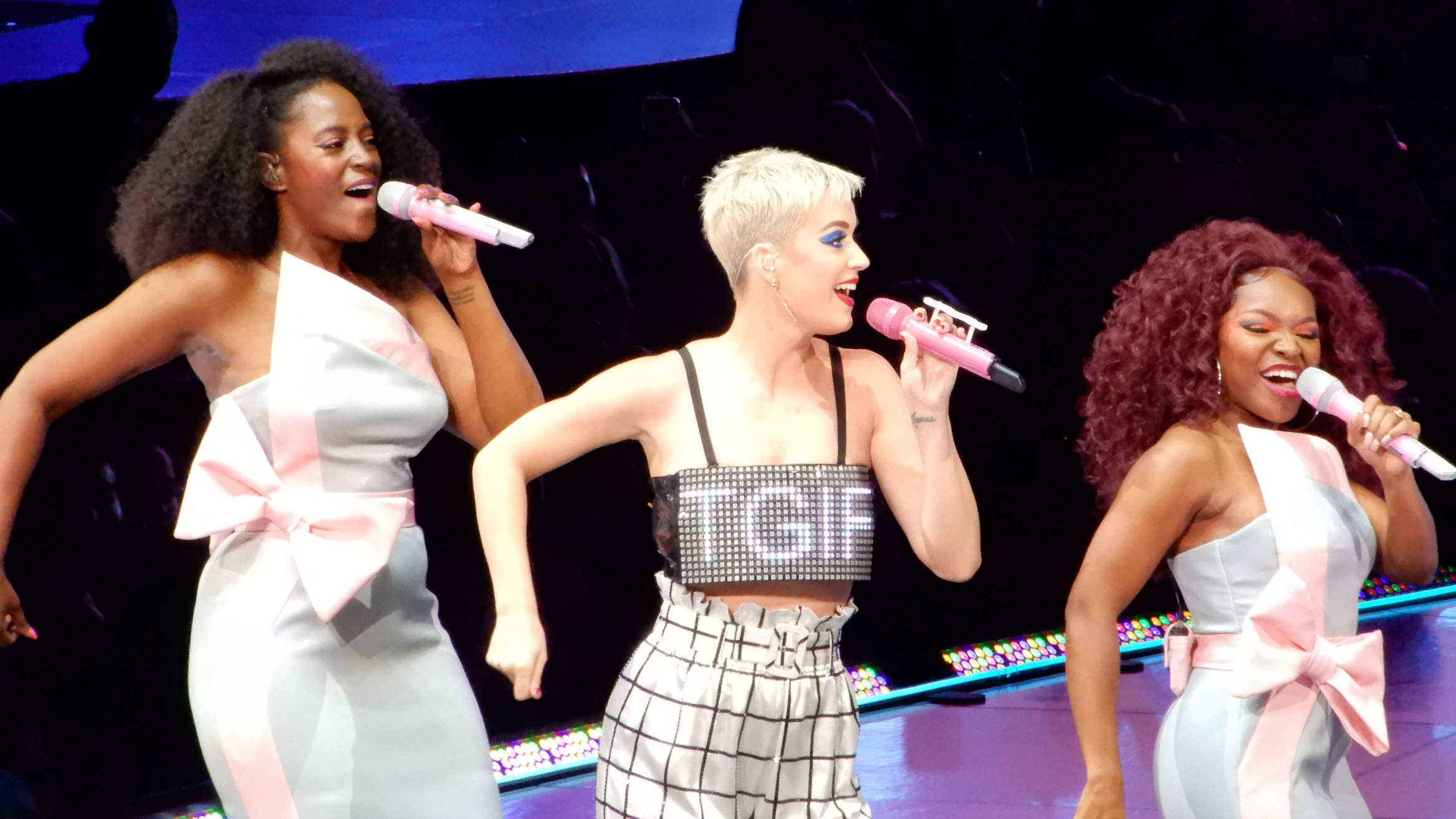
Perry with her backing vocalists performing the song during Witness: The Tour

AllMusic's Stephen Thomas Erlewine picked it among the top tracks on the album, and said that Perry "salutes fellow attention-whore Kesha on 'Last Friday Night (T.G.I.F.)'". Rob Sheffield from Rolling Stone wrote that "Perry likes her songs chatty; in the kegger romp 'Last Friday Night,' she chirps, 'Think I need a ginger ale/That was such an epic fail'". Matthew Cole of Slant Magazine said that "'Last Friday Night (T.G.I.F.)' is a lifeless roller-rink jam with a 'T! G! I! F!' shout-along that will no doubt provide the soundtrack to any number of trashy sorority parties this semester". Spin contributor Mikael Wood said that "Last Friday Night recounts an evening of nonstop naughtiness – think streaking, skinny-dipping, and ménage à trois-ing."

Jason Richards from Now wrote, "The singer recently said that the catchy 'Last Friday Night (T.G.I.F.)' is her version of 'I Gotta Feeling'. With lyrics about photos ending up online after a debauched evening, it's also reminiscent of Lady Gaga singing about drunkenly losing her keys and phone on 'Just Dance.' Derivative, sure, but the song strikes a perfect equilibrium between Perry's sex appeal and goofy, self-effacing charm". Marc Hawthorne from The A.V. Club said that "assuming that everything here is based on real life also means we have to accept that she's had a ménage à trois on the indie-rock-meets-American Idol cut Last Friday Night (T.G.I.F.)".

Chris Richards from The Washington Post said that "Over strummy guitars and zigzagging keyboards, Perry recounts an evening of debauchery with no repercussions, her innocent transgressions (streaking, skinny-dipping) mentioned in the same breath as more serious trouble (mysterious bruises, a blackout), but... [when] it's time for Perry to reflect on her 3 am follies, she stiffly sings, 'That was such an epic fail.' It sounds like a clueless parent's attempt to speak teenager." Billboard included the song in their Five Potential Pop Hits for 2011 list. Tom Hawthorne from Future Music Charts said that it sounds like a pop song as it should be without any auto-tune voice changes and hard DJ beats, which is the song's strength and weakness at the same time".

== Commercial performance ==
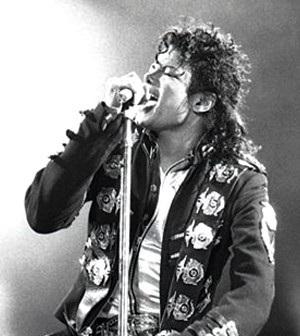
With the song, Perry became the second artist in history after Michael Jackson (pictured) to have five US number ones from the same album.

"Last Friday Night (T.G.I.F.)" made Perry the first and only female artist to have five number one singles from one album in the Billboard Hot 100, tying Michael Jackson's Bad, with his last number one single on that album being "Dirty Diana", on July 2, 1988. Perry's song debuted at number 67 on the Billboard Hot 100. It also charted at number 49 on the Canadian Hot 100 chart that same week. Following its single release, the song re-entered the Billboard Hot 100 on June 18, 2011, at number 63 and at number 31 on the Billboard Pop Songs. The following week, the song jumped 63–31 with the Hot 100's "Greatest Gainer" award. In its fourth week on the chart, "Friday" leaped to number four, spurred by a number one ranking on Hot Digital Songs. This made Teenage Dream the first album to have five songs hit number one on the chart. The song reached number three on the Billboard Hot 100 chart, on July 30. The following week, "Last Friday Night (T.G.I.F.)", reached a new position of number two, where it remained for three additional weeks, behind "Party Rock Anthem" by LMFAO feat. Lauren Bennett and GoonRock.

The song finally reached the number-one position on the Billboard Hot 100 on August 17, 2011, and spent two straight weeks there. The song became Perry's sixth number-one single on the Billboard Hot 100 chart, and her fifth consecutive number-one single. Perry became the first woman in the 53-year history of Billboard to take five singles from the same album to number one on the Billboard Hot 100, equaling the record established by Michael Jackson 23 years earlier. As of August 2020, the single has been certified 6 times platinum by the Recording Industry Association of America (RIAA) and sold 3.8 million copies in the US. According to Nielsen Broadcast Data Systems, "Last Friday Night (T.G.I.F)" was the tenth most played single on US radio during 2011 with 450,000 plays. The song has also peaked at number one on the Canadian Hot 100 and received a diamond certification from Music Canada (MC). "Last Friday Night (T.G.I.F.)" peaked at number two on the Irish Singles Chart. On the New Zealand Singles Chart it peaked at number four, marking Perry's first top spot miss, though it still managed to receive platinum by the Recording Industry Association of New Zealand, making it her fifth platinum selling single from her album. The song debuted at number 40 in Australia, and later peaked at number five in the country and going platinum. In the UK, the song peaked at No. 9 in the UK Singles Chart. September 17, 2011 marked Perry' 69th consecutive week in the Top 10 with the single. As of May 2022, "Last Friday Night (T.G.I.F.)" has sold 9.4 million copies worldwide.

== Music video ==
=== Background and release ===
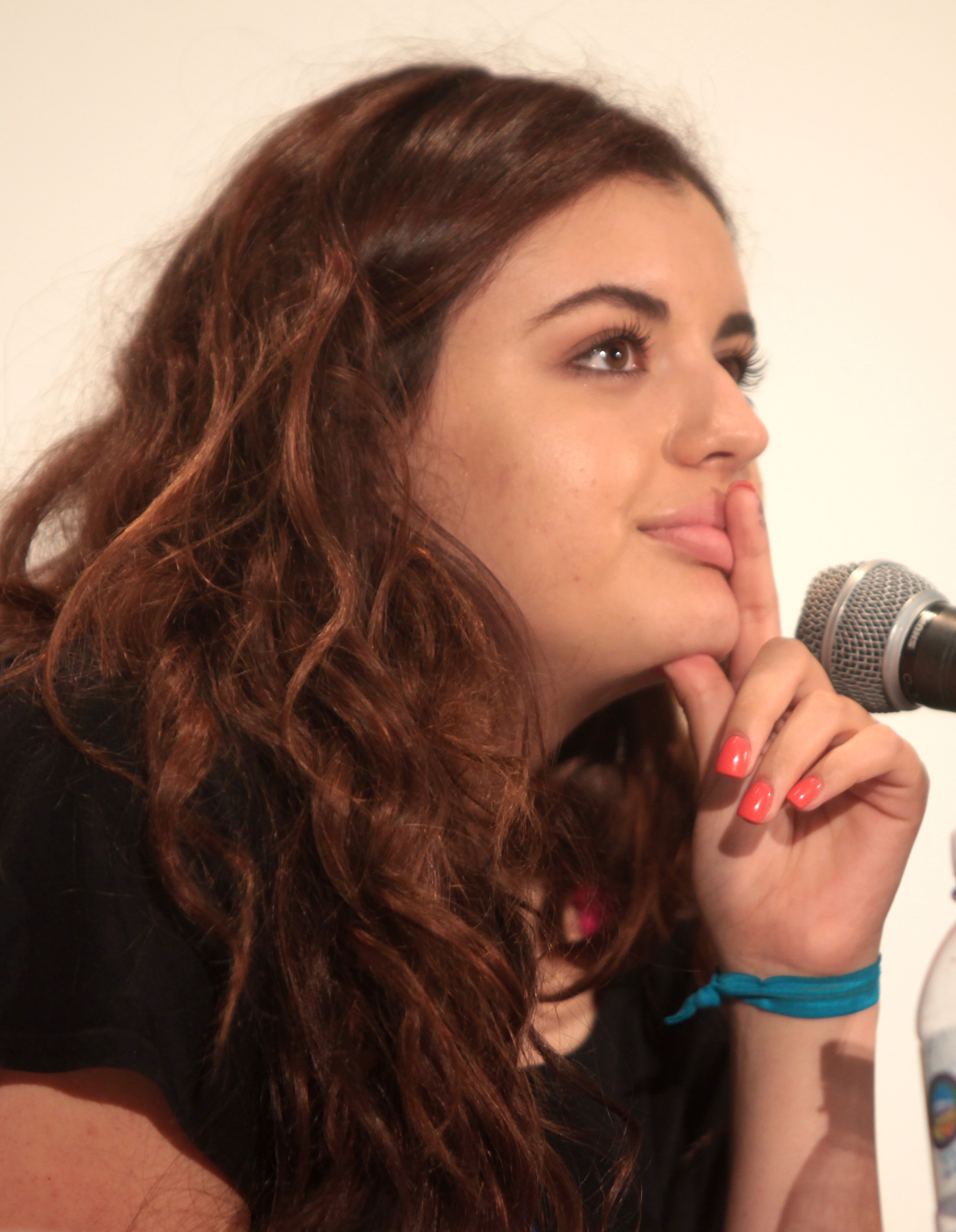
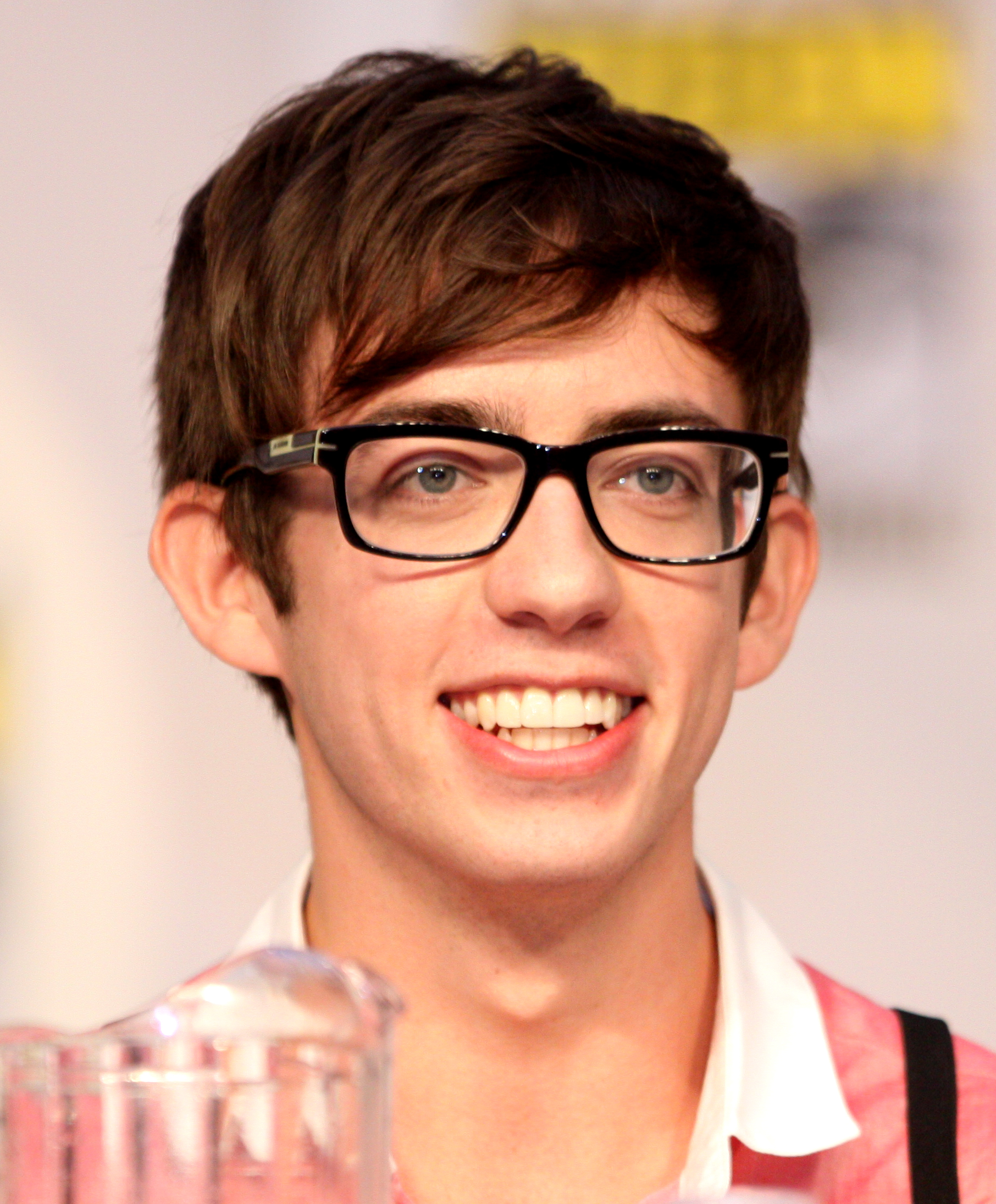
Rebecca Black (left) and Kevin McHale (right), from the TV series Glee, among other celebrities, star in the music video.

In an interview with MTV, director Marc Klasfeld said that the video's storyline was inspired by Sixteen Candles and other works of John Hughes, as well as "all those great '80s high school movies." Including a long series of outtakes during the ending credits was influenced by a similar idea in The Cannonball Run. The costume for Perry's character, Kathy Beth Terry, was inspired by the character Betty Suarez, played by America Ferrera on the series Ugly Betty. The music video for "Last Friday Night (T.G.I.F.)" was filmed around May 3–6, 2011 at the home of John Schneider. It was directed by Marc Klasfeld, and co-directed by Danny Lockwood. Perry tweeted, "I told someone about my new music video I just filmed & they responded with 'wow, that's gonna break the internet.'..... Should I knock on wood?"

Before the video premiered, Perry created Facebook and Twitter profiles for a "brace-faced nerd-turned-hottie" thirteen-year-old she plays named Kathy Beth Terry. Starting from June 8, a series of short video clips was uploaded on the Facebook profile, YouTube and Perry's official web version premiered later on the same day on Funny or Die. On July 11, after crossing the half-million "likes" mark, Perry released an interview in character as Terry on Digital Spy. Perry, in character as Kathy Beth Terry made various references to Rebecca Black and other guests on the video on her Twitter and Facebook. She also gave interviews to the Digital Spy, Australian Cosmopolitan, and BOP Tiger Beat.

The video went on to win Favorite Music Video award at the 38th People's Choice Awards.

=== Synopsis ===
Perry's alter-ego "Kathy Beth Terry" in the music video for "Last Friday Night (T.G.I.F.)"

"Kathy Beth Terry" (Perry), a teenager with braces, headgear, and oversized glasses, has just awakened the morning after a house party, surrounded by passed-out partygoers. A male guest, Aaron Christopherson (Glee star Darren Criss) opens the door to her bedroom and congratulates her on having the "best party ever." Puzzled as to what happened, she goes online, only to find pictures of herself in various compromising positions, including one picture of her licking the stomach of the boy in bed next to her. The video then goes into a flashback of the events that occurred the night before. While doing a Sudoku puzzle, Kathy hears loud music from the house next door, and goes over to complain. She is greeted by Rebecca Black (who appears as a homage to Black's viral video "Friday"), who invites her in. Everett McDonald (portrayed by Glee star Kevin McHale) ogles Kathy from afar and fantasizes about being with her.

However, Kathy is more interested in football player Steve Johnson (model Richie Nuzzolese), who turns her down because of her appearance and appears more interested in a blonde (Angela Frezza). To cheer her up, Black gives Kathy a makeover, ripping off her headgear with pliers, waxing her upper lip, dressing her in tight-fitting neon clothes, and teasing her hair out. Steve becomes enamored with her, and everyone starts dancing. Kathy and Rebecca are also seen playing a Just Dance dancing video game (a series that features songs by Perry), in this case, dancing to "Hot Stuff" by Donna Summer from Just Dance 2). In the backyard, pop-rock band Hanson acts as the house band while Kathy's uncle Kenny (musician Kenny G) appears and plays the saxophone solo on the roof of the house (done in a mimed performance, as he did not play the instrument in the actual recording). The entire party ends up moving to Kathy's house, where she throws up after drinking too much. Everett punches the football player for grabbing Kathy's buttocks (visualized by him as a medieval sword fight with Kathy as a damsel in distress).

At the end of the night, Kathy finally passes out next to the football player. The video shifts back to the next morning, where she looks at the photos with regret, but is also ecstatic to have a naked football player sleeping in her bed. The film ends with Corey Feldman and Debbie Gibson as Kathy's parents, Kirk and Tiffany Terry, confronting Kathy about the state of the house after hearing about uncle Kenny playing the saxophone, but forgiving her after recalling their own wild youth. The video's ending credits feature various deleted lines, bloopers, and extra scenes from the party, as well as Everett bringing Kathy breakfast in bed. After the credits end, it repeats the shot where Kathy gets tape ripped off her upper lip, but her scream is heard this time.

== Live performances ==
On September 5, 2010, Perry performed the song live for the first time along with "Teenage Dream", "Firework" and "Not Like the Movies" in the show's launch of the Teenage Dream in Berlin. Though the song has never been performed live as part of a televised performance, the song is featured on the set lists of the California Dreams Tour, Prismatic World Tour, Witness: The Tour and her residency Play. This song is going to be on her setlist for The Lifetimes Tour (2025). The first televised performance was during her presentation at Rock In Rio, which was broadcast live by the Multishow. During this song, photos of fans are displayed on the screens.

== Formats and track listings ==
- Promotional CD single
1. "Last Friday Night (T.G.I.F.)" (Album Version) – 3:52
2. "Last Friday Night (T.G.I.F.)" (Instrumental) – 3:48
- Promotional CD single – Remixes – (Version 2)
1. "Last Friday Night (T.G.I.F.)" (Sidney Samson Dub) – 6:04
2. "Last Friday Night (T.G.I.F.)" (Sidney Samson Club Mix) – 6:19
3. "Last Friday Night (T.G.I.F.)" (Sidney Samson Extended Edit) – 4:12
- Digital download – remix single
1. "Last Friday Night (T.G.I.F.)" (featuring Missy Elliott) – 3:58

== Credits and personnel ==
Credits adapted from Teenage Dream album liner notes.

- Katy Perry – songwriter, vocals
- Dr. Luke – songwriter, producer, drums, keyboards, programming
- Max Martin – songwriter, producer, drums, keyboards, programming
- Bonnie McKee – songwriter
- Emily Wright – engineer
- Sam Holland – engineer
- Tucker Bodine – assistant engineer
- Tatiana Gottwald – assistant engineer
- Şerban Ghenea – mixing
- Jon Hanes – mix engineer
- Tim Roberts – assistant mix engineer
- Lenny Pickett – saxophone

== Charts ==
=== Weekly charts ===
Weekly chart performance for "Last Friday Night (T.G.I.F.)"
Chart (2011)	Peak position
Australia (ARIA)	5
Austria (Ö3 Austria Top 40)	7
Belgium (Ultratop 50 Flanders)	22
Belgium (Ultratop 50 Wallonia)	25
Canada Hot 100 (Billboard)	1
CIS Airplay (TopHit)	37
Croatia International Airplay (HRT)	2
Czech Republic Airplay (ČNS IFPI)	1
Denmark (Tracklisten)	34
Euro Digital Song Sales (Billboard)	7
Finland Download (Latauslista)	25
France (SNEP)	22
Germany (GfK)	15
Hungary (Rádiós Top 40)	5
Iceland (Tónlistinn)	7
Ireland (IRMA)	2
Israel (Media Forest)	15
Italy (FIMI)	9
Japan Hot 100 (Billboard)	48
Lebanon (OLT20)	3
Luxembourg Digital Song Sales (Billboard)	9
Mexico (Billboard Mexican Airplay)	2
Mexico Anglo (Monitor Latino)	2
Netherlands (Dutch Top 40)	7
Netherlands (Single Top 100)	24
New Zealand (Recorded Music NZ)	4
Peru (UNIMPRO)	8
Poland Airplay (ZPAV)	5
Romania (Romanian Top 100)	56
Russia Airplay (TopHit)	39
Scottish Singles Sales (Official Charts)	7
Slovakia Airplay (ČNS IFPI)	1
South Korea International (Gaon)	7
Spain (Promusicae)	38
Sweden (Sverigetopplistan)	33
Switzerland (Schweizer Hitparade)	20
Turkey (Number One Top 20)	19
Ukraine Airplay (TopHit)	11
UK Singles (Official Charts)	9
US Billboard Hot 100	1
US Adult Contemporary (Billboard)	17
US Adult Pop Airplay (Billboard)	1
US Bubbling Under R&B/Hip-Hop Songs (Billboard)	10
US Dance Club Songs (Billboard)	1
US Dance Airplay (Billboard)	4
US Pop Airplay (Billboard)	1
US Rhythmic Airplay (Billboard)	7
Venezuela (Record Report) Pop/Rock	1

Chart (2026)	Peak position
Global 200 (Billboard)	184
Portugal (AFP)	158

=== Monthly charts ===
Monthly chart performance for "Last Friday Night (T.G.I.F.)"
Chart (2011)	Peak position
Russia Airplay (TopHit)	49
Ukraine Airplay (TopHit)	16

=== Year-end charts ===
Yearly chart performance for "Last Friday Night (T.G.I.F.)"
Chart (2011)	Peak position
Australia (ARIA)	31
Belgium (Ultratop 50 Flanders)	86
Brazil (Crowley)	13
Canada (Canadian Hot 100)	12
Croatia International Airplay (HRT)	9
Germany (Official German Charts)	88
Hungary (Rádiós Top 40)	45
Italy (Musica e dischi)	27
Netherlands (Dutch Top 40)	34
Netherlands (Single Top 100)	87
New Zealand (Recorded Music NZ)	24
Ukraine Airplay (TopHit)	70
UK Singles (OCC)	45
US Billboard Hot 100	14
US Mainstream Top 40 (Billboard)	4
US Adult Top 40 (Billboard)	11
US Dance Club Songs (Billboard)	6
US Dance/Mix Show Airplay (Billboard)	48
US Rhythmic (Billboard)	30

Chart (2012)	Position
Brazil (Crowley)	17

== Certifications and sales ==
Certifications for "Last Friday Night (T.G.I.F.)"
Region	Certification	Certified units/sales
Australia (ARIA)	11× Platinum	770,000^{‡}
Austria (IFPI Austria)	Platinum	30,000^{*}
Brazil (Pro-Música Brasil)	3× Platinum	180,000^{‡}
Canada (Music Canada)	Diamond	800,000^{‡}
Denmark (IFPI Danmark)	2× Platinum	180,000^{‡}
Finland	3× Platinum	12,000
France (SNEP)	Diamond	333,333^{‡}
Germany (BVMI)	Platinum	600,000^{‡}
Italy (FIMI)	Platinum	30,000^{*}
Mexico (AMPROFON)	Gold	30,000^{*}
New Zealand (RMNZ)	5× Platinum	150,000^{‡}
Norway (IFPI Norway)	4× Platinum	240,000^{‡}
South Korea Remix featuring Missy Elliott	—	189,389 (Note: South Korea sales figures as of December 2011.)
Spain (Promusicae)	Platinum	60,000^{‡}
Switzerland (IFPI Switzerland)	Gold	15,000^{^}
United Kingdom (BPI)	3× Platinum	1,800,000^{‡}
United States (RIAA)	6× Platinum	6,000,000^{‡}
Streaming
Denmark (IFPI Danmark)	Gold	50,000^{†}
Greece (IFPI Greece)	Platinum	2,000,000^{†}
Summaries
Worldwide	—	9,400,000 (Note: Worldwide sales figures as of May 2022.)
^{*} Sales figures based on certification alone.^{^} Shipments figures based on certification alone.^{‡} Sales+streaming figures based on certification alone.^{†} Streaming-only figures based on certification alone.

== Release history ==
Release dates and formats for "Last Friday Night (T.G.I.F.)"
Region	Date	Format(s)	Version	Label	Ref.
United States	June 6, 2011	Contemporary hit radio; rhythmic contemporary radio	Original	Capitol	
Italy	June 17, 2011	Radio airplay	Original	EMI	
United States	June 27, 2011	Adult contemporary radio; hot adult contemporary radio; modern contemporary radio	Original	Capitol	
Various	August 8, 2011	Digital download	Remix featuring Missy Elliott	Capitol	
United States	August 8, 2011	Contemporary hit radio	Remix featuring Missy Elliott	Capitol	

== See also ==
- List of Canadian Hot 100 number-one singles of 2011
- List of Billboard Hot 100 number ones of 2011
- List of number-one digital songs of 2011 (U.S.)
- List of Billboard Dance Club Songs number ones of 2011
- List of Billboard Mainstream Top 40 number-one songs of 2011
- List of Radio Songs number ones of the 2010s
- List of Billboard Adult Top 40 number-one songs of the 2010s
- List of highest-certified singles in Australia
