= Friday (Rebecca Black song) =

2011 single by Rebecca Black

Single by Rebecca Black
- Released: March 14, 2011
- Recorded: 2010
- Genre: Teen pop; dance-pop
- Length: 3:30 (single release); 3:44 (music video version with rap)
- Label: ARK Music Factory
- Songwriters: Clarence Jey; Patrice Wilson
- Producers: Clarence Jey; Patrice Wilson

Rebecca Black singles chronology
"Friday" (2011)	"My Moment" (2011)

Music video
- "Friday" on YouTube

"Friday" is the debut single by American singer Rebecca Black. It was written and produced by Los Angeles record producers Clarence Jey and Patrice Wilson. The song's music video was released on February 10, 2011; it was officially released as a single on streaming platforms on March 14, 2011. A teen pop song, "Friday" features Black singing about her daily morning routine and her excitement for the upcoming weekend. The song makes heavy use of Auto-Tune, and also includes a rap verse from Wilson, which was uncredited on the single.

Black was inspired to record a song with Jey and Wilson's music production company, ARK Music Factory, after seeing a high school classmate produce a music video with them. The music video for "Friday" caught a sudden surge of hits after Mystery Science Theater 3000 and RiffTrax comedian Michael J. Nelson called it "the worst video ever made" on Twitter and the song was featured on the Tosh.0 blog. The song's reception was highly negative, and it was parodied by numerous artists and comedians.

The original music video was removed from YouTube on June 16, 2011, due to legal disputes between ARK Music and Black. The video was later re-uploaded to YouTube on September 16, 2011. The music video for the song is one of the most disliked YouTube videos of all time. Since the growth in popularity of the song and video, there have been numerous parody videos and remixes. On February 10, 2021, to commemorate the song's tenth anniversary, Black released an official hyperpop remix featuring 3OH!3, Big Freedia and Dorian Electra to more positive reviews.

== Background and production ==
"Friday" co-writer Patrice Wilson, a co-founder of ARK Music Factory, explained that he "wrote the lyrics on a Thursday night going into a Friday. I was writing different songs all night and was like, 'Wow, I've been up a long time and it's Friday.' And I was like, wow, it is Friday!"

An ARK Music Factory client told Black's mother about the company's production services in late 2010; Black was 13 at the time, and living in the Anaheim Hills planned community in Anaheim, California. Black's mother, Georgina Kelly, paid ARK Music $4,000 for a song and accompanying video that included a choice of two pre-written songs "Super Woman" and "Friday". According to Kelly, the payment covered one half or less of the production costs of the music video, and Black's family could have paid nothing in exchange for giving up all rights to the song. Black chose "Friday", as "Super Woman" "was about adult love–I haven't experienced that yet". "I felt like it was my personality in that song". ARK Music extensively used the pitch-correcting software Auto-Tune. Although Kelly had some doubts over the quality of the lyrics, Black assured her that "she sang it as they wrote it."

== Composition ==
"Friday"
A 22-second sample of "Friday", featuring the chorus where Black sings, "Friday, Friday, gotta get down on Friday".

"Friday" uses the '50s progression, a I–vi–IV–V chord progression that many popular songs have used such as "Heart and Soul" and "Unchained Melody". It is performed in the key of B major at a tempo of 112 beats per minute. According to Randy Lewis of the Los Angeles Times, the familiar structure contributes to the song's catchiness, making it what others have called an earworm. The song also sees Black on a harmony track. In a review for Rolling Stone, writer Matthew Perpetua described the vocals as having "a peculiar tonality that inadvertently highlights the absurdity of boilerplate pop lyrics", adding that the tone in the refrain "sounds unlike anything else in pop music". He noted the sound as being not entirely agreeable to listen to, but stated that Black ultimately ends up "sounding like a distinct singer with an alluring sort of anti-charisma". The lyrics of the song speak about "hanging out with friends and having fun". The lyrics reflect the happenings of a day, in the life of a teenager like Black, like eating breakfast and going to school. "She's excited 'cause it's Friday. Which means a weekend full of possibility awaits", a Plugged In reviewer concluded.

== Critical reception ==
"Friday" was panned by music critics, for its songwriting, instrumentation, Black's vocals, and the video choreography. Lyndsey Parker of Yahoo! Music asked if it could be "the worst song ever". On March 29, 2011, it surpassed Justin Bieber's "Baby" as the most disliked YouTube video, with 1.17 million dislikes, and once had over 3 million "dislikes", accounting for 88% of the total ratings of the video. The video was later removed, although it has since been officially re-uploaded. The co-writer and producer of "Friday", Clarence Jey, said about the song that "the concept we feel seems to have crossed a lot of boundaries, for the better or worse". Observers have called it "bizarre", "inept", and "hilariously dreadful". The song and Black herself were "savaged" on social networks across the Internet, while being seen as a "YouTube laughing stock". On YouTube, the video was met with negative comments and video responses, including comments interpreted as "violent". Kevin Rutherford, a columnist for Billboard magazine, wrote, "Black's video for 'Friday' is one of those rare occurrences where even the most seasoned critics of Internet culture don't know where to begin. From the singing straight out of Auto-Tuned hell to lyrics such as 'Tomorrow is Saturday/And Sunday comes afterwards/I don't want this weekend to end' and a hilariously bad rap about passing school buses, 'Friday' is something that simply must be seen and heard to be fully appreciated." Many other reviewers also singled out the lyrics in particular for criticism, which were described as "overly simple and repetitive" by TNT magazine. Jim Edwards of BNET and Doug Gross of CNN both noted that the rap break from the considerably older rapper was "creepy". Time magazine ranked it number two on a list of "Top 10 Songs with Silly Lyrics".

Despite the overwhelmingly negative reviews, a few reviewers had positive things to say about the song and video. Entertainment Weekly writer Joseph Lynch noted that there was "something sickeningly catchy about this tune that keeps you coming back for more." Rolling Stone's Perpetua stated, "When you see this video, you immediately notice everything that it does wrong, but it actually gets a lot of things about pop music right, if just by accident." OK! Magazine also noted that "some are calling the 13-year-old signed singer the next Justin Bieber." After watching the video, singer Chris Brown said "Honest opinion? It was great. I'll be jammin to it on Friday, Friday." Fellow teenage singer Miley Cyrus denied that she had criticized Black, saying "I am a fan" and that she sang "Friday" while driving. Simon Cowell praised Black, saying "I love her [and] the fact that she's got so much publicity...People are so upset about the song, but I think it's hysterical...Anyone who can create this much controversy within a week, I want to meet. I love people like that." He observed that "Any song to do with the weekend annoys you. It reminds me of 'Saturday Night'... It's what we call a 'hair-dryer song,' a song girls sing into their hair dryers as they're getting ready to go out. But the fact that it's making people so angry is brilliant." Cowell advised Black not to "listen to anyone over the age of 18. I'm being deadly serious. Whatever she's done has worked. Whether you like her or not, she's the most talked-about artist in America right now. Nobody over the age of 18 should understand her or like her. So she should just do it her way."

Patrice Wilson released his sequel to the song on May 6, 2012, titled "Happy", focusing on Saturdays. Black released her own follow-up to the song, entitled "Saturday", in December 2013.

== Chart performance ==
By March 21, 2011, the "Friday" music video had been viewed more than 30 million times on YouTube. Forbes estimated that as of that date, Black and ARK Music had earned $20,000 from YouTube's revenue-sharing program, and Billboard estimated iTunes sales of approximately 43,000 copies, roughly equivalent to $26,700 in royalties. Within a week after being released on iTunes, it had jumped to 19 on their sales chart, on March 19, 2011. "Friday" debuted on the US Hot Digital Songs chart at number 57 and went on to peak at number 38. As of 2021, the song has sold more than 500,000 copies in the United States; consequently it was certified Platinum by the Recording Industry Association of America (RIAA).

"Friday" debuted on the New Zealand Singles Chart at number 33 on March 21, 2011. The song entered the Billboard Hot 100 at number 72 and rose to 58 the next week. It sold 87,000 copies in the United States over its first two weeks and has gone on to sell 442,000 copies, as of December 2013. The song also received airplay in Sweden. In the United States, it was played 12 times from March 16 to 22, considered low for a Hot 100 song. Despite the song's strong performance elsewhere, Georgina Kelly claimed in late March 2011 that her daughter had not received any money from the song's sales to that point in time, saying "We haven't received a dime from anywhere".

Chart (2011–2012)	Peak position
Australian Digital Tracks (ARIA)	40
Brasil Hot 100 Airplay (Billboard Brasil)	66
Brazil Pop Songs (Billboard Brasil)	79
Canada Hot 100 (Billboard)	61
Ireland (IRMA)	46
New Zealand (Recorded Music NZ)	33
Scottish Singles Sales (Official Charts)	45
UK Singles (Official Charts)	60
US Billboard Hot 100	58
US Heatseekers Songs (Billboard)	1

=== Certifications ===
Region	Certification	Certified units/sales
United States (RIAA)	Platinum	1,000,000^{‡}
^{‡} Sales+streaming figures based on certification alone.

== Music video ==
=== Development and summary ===
The concept for the music video is based on the lyrics and presented as a typical Friday for Black. She wakes up and goes to school, meeting her friends on the way. In the evening, after debating whether to sit in the front or back of a convertible, Black and her friends ride the car to a party at 7:45 pm. Patrice Wilson appears near the end of the song to deliver a short rap. The video was shot on January 6, 2011 at Black's father's house with friends and family as extras, and requiring multiple takes over 12 hours. ARK Music, according to Black's parents, cautioned them and her that they should not expect her to become famous. Black hoped that her friends and family would enjoy watching the video on YouTube and that it would perhaps help her to later begin a singing career.

=== Reception ===
The music video was first posted on February 10, 2011. Following its original release, it received 4,000 views, enough to please Black, before comedian Michael J. Nelson's Twitter account and a Tosh.0 blog post, Songwriting Isn't for Everyone, drew attention to it on March 11, 2011, turning the video into a viral hit. Criticism of the song's lyrics, the use of Auto-Tune on Black's vocals, and the content of the video also caused it to become viral. On May 9, 2011, comments became subject to prior approval for posting. Two days later, commenting was disabled altogether and archives removed. By June 15, 2011, the video had more than 166 million views, and 3.2 million dislikes from YouTube users against just 454,000 likes. It also peaked in the top 20 most watched YouTube videos of all time.

After reading the harsh reviews of "Friday", Black said that "those hurtful comments really shocked me." ARK Music offered to take the video down from YouTube, but Black refused the offer, saying that she did not wish to "give the haters the satisfaction that they got me so bad I gave up." Black's father has accompanied her in public to guard against potential accosters. In response to criticism over the song's significant use of Auto-Tune, Black performed an acoustic version during an interview with ABC News, which earned over 180,000 dislikes on YouTube (84% of total ratings) by November 2011. Later in the interview Black's mother, Kelly, stated that she was angry and upset after Black was brought to tears by comments, such as "I hope you go cut yourself and die" and "I hope you cut yourself and get an eating disorder so you'll look pretty." Black said, however, that soon she was able to ignore such comments, and asked Justin Bieber, her idol, to perform a duet with her. Although Bieber did not release an official announcement regarding the offer, he posted on Twitter, "sunday comes after saturday? weird." Bieber later sang part of the chorus at one of his concerts. Rolling Stone's Perpetua again praised Black after the interview, saying "She is actually a pretty decent singer" and "She is a total sweetheart. [...] Black comes off as a well-adjusted, happy and grateful kid." He also pointed out Black's intention to donate part of the profits from the song to school arts programs and relief efforts in Japan following the 2011 Tōhoku earthquake and tsunami. Benni Cinkle, who became known as "that girl in pink" and appears during the second verse of the video, released her own song entitled "Can You See Me Now" and created an anti-bullying organization That Girl in Pink Foundation due to the negative response she got from "Friday".

In November 2011, NME placed the video for "Friday" at number one on their list of "50 Worst Music Videos Ever".

=== Controversy ===
Not long after the "Friday" video went viral on YouTube, Black and her mother, Georgina Kelly, got into legal issues with ARK Music over rights to the song. In a March 29, 2011, letter from Kelly's lawyer to ARK Music, it was alleged that ARK Music failed to fulfill the terms of their November 2010 agreement by not giving her the song and video's master recordings; by claiming Black as exclusively signed to the label; and by exploiting the song without permission, selling a "Friday" ringtone, for example. While Wilson stated that Kelly "will get the masters and the song they can have it all", and agreed that Black was not exclusive to ARK, his attorney claimed that ARK owns the copyright for the song and the November agreement is invalid. In June 2011, ARK Music Factory started charging $2.99 to watch the music video on YouTube. Black's initial response was through a message through her Twitter account saying: "Thanks for all the messages regarding the $2.99 fee added to Friday video, I have nothing to do with this!!"

On June 16, 2011, YouTube took down the official music video for "Friday". Instead, a message in place of the video read: "This video is no longer available due to a copyright claim by Rebecca Black. Sorry about that." A spokesman for Black said her legal team had asked YouTube to take the video down because of an ongoing legal dispute with the song's producers ARK Music Factory. ARK Music Factory responded by saying it was disappointed that Black decided to have the video pulled from YouTube despite the two parties being in "good faith negotiations". It added: "There's been an ongoing, open dialogue with our company. So we were blindsided to get a 'Take Down Notice' alleging copyright infringement instead of a call or e-mail from Rebecca's representatives. Our use of the video has fully been authorized (as evidenced by four uninterrupted months and 160 million-plus viewings without objection) by both Ms. Black and the copyright holder. Regardless, we are going to continue to take the high road and work out the complaint as soon as possible, so that the million-plus people who watch Friday for free each day can continue to enjoy the video." On September 16, 2011, the music video was restored to YouTube, on Black's official channel.

In June 2023, Entertainment Weekly reported on what it described as "an old meme" asserting that the song was secretly about the assassination of John F. Kennedy, which occurred on a Friday. Black herself had recently stated that she could not say whether the meme was true or not because she had not written the song. The report noted that the meme asserted some incorrect details. Specifically, the meme claimed that Kennedy ate a bowl of cereal on that morning, and that the driver of Kennedy's vehicle was named "Samuel Kickin" (with the lyric, "Kickin in the front seat, sittin' in the back seat" therefore referring to the positions of the driver and Kennedy), when in fact Kennedy had eaten toast with marmalade and eggs for breakfast, and the driver of the vehicle was a U.S. Secret Service agent named William Greer.

== Track listing ==
- Digital download
1. "Friday" – 3:30

== Remix ==
"Friday (Remix)"

Single by Rebecca Black featuring 3OH!3, Big Freedia and Dorian Electra
- Released: February 10, 2021
- Genre: Hyperpop
- Length: 2:56
- Label: Self-released
- Songwriters: Clarence Jey; Patrice Wilson
- Producer: Dylan Brady

Rebecca Black singles chronology
"Girlfriend" (2021)	"Friday (Remix)" (2021)	"Personal" (2021)

3OH!3 singles chronology
"I'm So Sad" (2021)	"Friday (Remix)" (2021)	"Last Breath" (2021)

Big Freedia singles chronology
"Chasing Rainbows" (2020)	"Friday (Remix)" (2021)	"Platinum" (2021)

Dorian Electra singles chronology
"My Agenda" (2020)	"Friday (Remix)" (2021)	"Ram It Down" (2021)

Music video
- "Friday (Remix)" on YouTube

On February 8, 2021, Black teased a 10-year anniversary remix of "Friday" featuring "some iconic people" on Twitter. The remix was released on February 10, 2021, and features vocals from crunkcore duo 3OH!3, New Orleans's "queen of bounce" Big Freedia, and alt-pop musician Dorian Electra, alongside production from Dylan Brady of 100 gecs. Of her choice of collaborators for the remix, Black explained: "I'd had the idea to do this remix of 'Friday' for years leading up to now, but honestly it was also mildly insane for me to think anyone else would want to be a part of it".

=== Composition ===
Opposed to the original's bubblegum style, this new "maximalist makeover", "morphs the original's simple pop aesthetic into a hyperpop overload." Black's chiptune vocals are "glitched-out" and distorted to the point of being unrecognizable, accompanied by "a pounding bass kick and pixellated synth line" from Brady. Electra's verse tells the story of the song from the perspective of another person in the car, while 3OH!3 turns the track into "an ethereal, synth-filled chorale" and Freedia "rips the song back into a thrumming dance rhythm".

=== Critical reception ===
Ben Jolley rated the remix four stars out of five in his review for NME, calling it a "serotonin-boosting rollercoaster ride" with "endless replay value". Writing for Billboard, Stephen Daw praised Brady's production for "[giving] it a fresh, modern refurbishing". Similarly, Jon Blistein of Rolling Stone considered that it had "[warped] the sanitized mall pop into something delightfully delirious".

=== Track listing ===
- Digital download
1. "Friday" (Remix) – 2:56
- CD
1. "Friday" (Remix) – 2:56
2. "Girlfriend" – 3:24

== Cover versions and popular culture ==
=== Glee Cast cover ===
"Friday"

Single by Glee cast

from the album Glee: The Music – The Complete Season Two
- Released: May 10, 2011
- Recorded: 2011
- Songwriters: Clarence Jey; Patrice Wilson

A cover version of "Friday" was released by the cast of season two of the television series Glee. The cast performed it on the show as well. The official release features cast members Puck (Mark Salling), Artie (Kevin McHale), and Sam (Chord Overstreet) on vocals, as part of the prom festivities on the "Prom Queen" episode that aired on May 10, 2011. Series co-creator Ryan Murphy explained to The Hollywood Reporter the use of the viral hit as a tribute to popular culture. He said: "There’s a rule for it that's explained in the show. The Glee Club is hired to perform songs for the prom and they were told by the principal to please do popular songs that the kids know." Murphy noted that Glee's "Friday" cover offers a different take since it's sung by males for other 17-year-olds: "The show pays tribute to pop culture and, love it or hate it, that song is pop culture."

Charts

Chart (2011)	Peak position
Australia (ARIA)	74
Canada (Canadian Hot 100)	33
Ireland (IRMA)	46
UK Singles (Official Charts Company)	46
US Billboard Hot 100	34

=== Other versions and performances ===
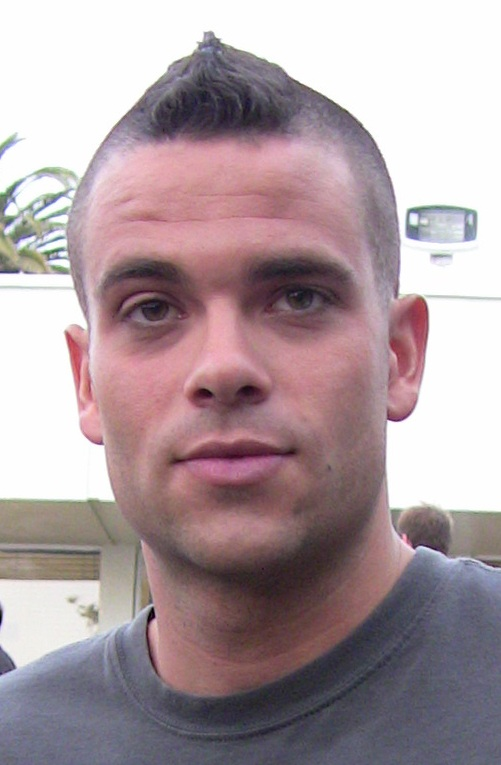
Mark Salling of Glee

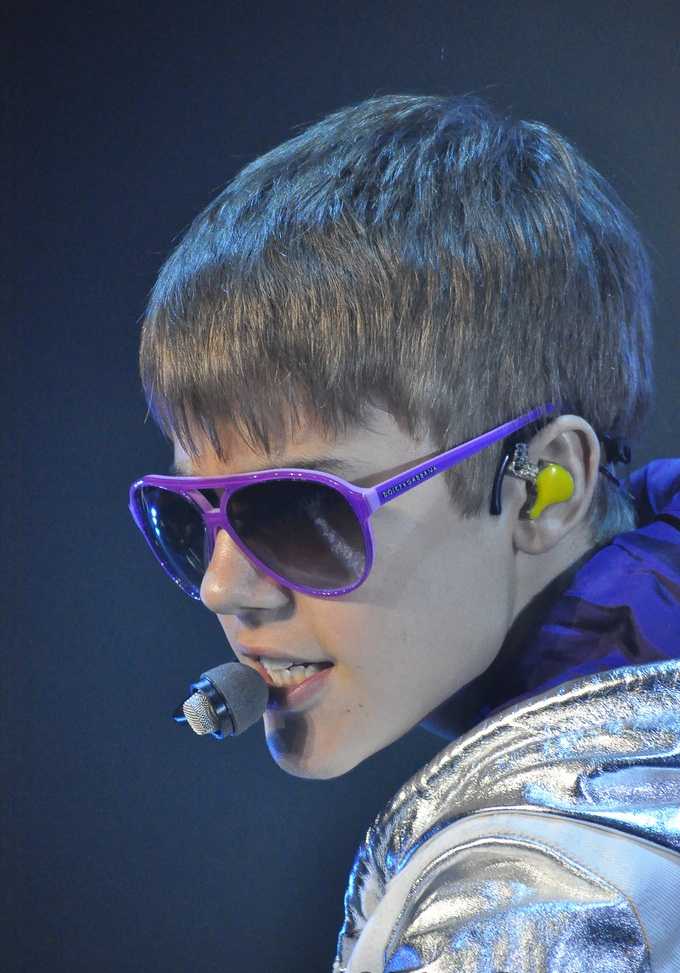
Justin Bieber

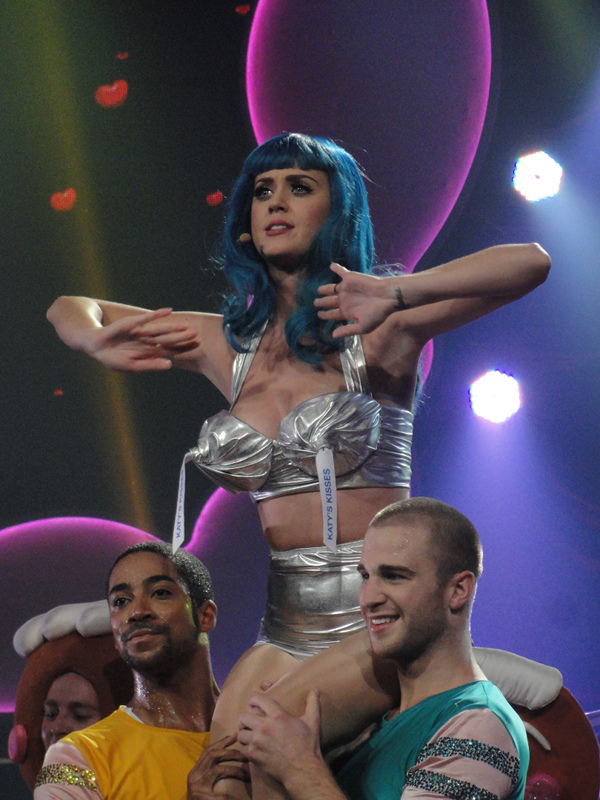
Katy Perry

There have been multiple covers of the song, including on the television series Glee, in concert by Justin Bieber and Katy Perry, separately.

On April 1, 2011, "Friday" was performed by Stephen Colbert, Jimmy Fallon, Taylor Hicks, and the Roots on Late Night with Jimmy Fallon. The New York Knicks City Dancers joined in. Jimmy Fallon released "Friday" as part of his 2012 Warner Records album, Blow Your Pants Off, which featured high-profile acts such as Paul McCartney and Bruce Springsteen. The album won Best Comedy Album at the 2013 Grammy Awards.

U.S.-born Chinese artist Dawen Wang (王大文; Wáng Dàwén) made a popular Mandarin cover of "Friday", which become a viral runaway hit in 2011.

The song has also been covered in a recording by Richard Cheese, and live in concerts by Todd Rundgren, Odd Future, Nick Jonas, and Justin Bieber. Singer Katy Perry performed the song on selected dates during her California Dreams Tour, including at the Rod Laver Arena, Newcastle Entertainment Centre, TD Garden, Air Canada Centre and the 1stBank Center. During the concert of August 5 at the Nokia Theatre L.A. Live, Black joined Perry onstage, performing the song as a duet.

Numerous parodies of "Friday" have been uploaded to YouTube and have become viral in their own right. Conan O'Brien and Andy Richter also made a joint parody entitled "Thursday" on the Conan show on TBS. The YouTube phenomenon Bad Lip Reading was launched when an anonymous music and video producer replaced the audio to the "Friday" video with new music and lyrics about gang fighting. Gang Fight", released in March 2011, earned Bad Lip Reading a million hits and thousands of subscribers, with many spoofs soon following.

Black appears as herself in the music video of Perry's single "Last Friday Night (T.G.I.F.)". She appears as the host of a party in the house next door to that of "Kathy Beth Terry". At the end of the video, "Terry" attempts to blame the excesses of the party (which had subsequently moved to her own house) on Black, only for her parents (Corey Feldman and Debbie Gibson) to disbelieve her.

ARK Music Factory launched its "Ark's TGI Friday Covers" project, showcasing cover versions of "Friday" by well-known artists alongside other user-submitted tributes, re-works, and parodies of the song/video and inviting users to submit their versions for relaying through ARK Music Factory's site. In November 2012, multiple outlets suggested that Nicole Westbrook was "the new Rebecca Black", on release of Patrice Wilson's "It's Thanksgiving". Kohl's Department Stores used a modified version of the song as its 2011 Black Friday advertising jingle. The hook "It's Friday, Friday, gotta get down on Friday" was changed to "It's Black Friday, Black Friday, Gotta go to Kohl's on Black Friday".

Black made her national television debut by performing a mash-up of the song along with her second single, "My Moment", during America's Got Talent's result night for the YouTube Special round on August 10, 2011, featuring various acts who had auditioned via YouTube. Black sang an acoustic version of the song on Good Morning America. Black performed "Friday" along with "My Moment", live in Suncorp Place, Sydney as a part of Telstra's 4G LTE network launch. She also sang "Friday" live on The Tonight Show with Jay Leno.

In 2018, Roger McGuinn of the Byrds included a cover version of the song in his studio album Sweet Memories. His version is based on an earlier the Byrds live performance version of the song being a track written by Bob Dylan.

On National French Fry Day 2018, YouTube personality Miranda Sings, in collaboration with Dunkin' Donuts, released an adapted version of "Friday", as part of the Donut Fries marketing strategy.
