= List of viral music videos =

Viral music videos are those that have gained rapid attention on the Internet. Like Internet memes, viewership of such videos tend to expand rapidly and become more widespread because the instant communication facilitates word of mouth.

This list documents music videos known to have become viral (the two sections are sorted in alphabetical order); other viral videos can be found at list of viral videos with additional videos that have become Internet phenomena for other categories can be found at list of Internet phenomena.

== Major music videos ==
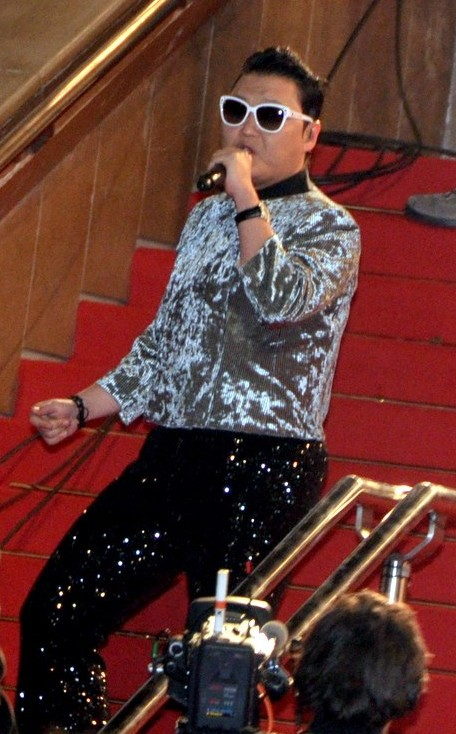
Psy's "Gangnam Style" video was the most-watched video on YouTube from November 2012 to July 2017.

These videos are videos from various artists that have gained viral popularity after their release.

- "APT." – a song by New Zealand and South Korean singer Rosé and American singer Bruno Mars. The song spent many weeks on top of the Billboard Hot 100 and became one of the fastest songs ever to reach one billion views on YouTube.
- "Ai Se Eu Te Pego" – a Brazilian Portuguese song made popular by the Brazilian singer Michel Teló during the height of the Música sertaneja craze. The international success of the main release of the song made the song go viral. The song peaked at number 81 on the Billboard Hot 100.
- "Axel F" – a remix of the Beverly Hills Cop theme by Crazy Frog. The song peaked at number 1 in the UK Charts in 2005, as well in different countries in Europe. The song received renewed attention in 2016.
- "Baby Shark Dance" – a children's viral educational music video made by South Korean education brand Pinkfong that went viral due to its poppy and repetitive lyrics, and is also the most viewed video on YouTube, with over 16 billion views.
- "Bad and Boujee" – a song by rap group Migos. The song became a meme when people made edits on the line "Raindrop, droptop".
- "Chandelier" - a song by Australian singer Sia. The music video went viral in 2014 and became the seventh most-watched video on YouTube in 2014.
- "Dat $tick" – a song by Indonesian rapper Rich Brian. It went viral after many rappers reacted to it.
- "Despacito" – the official video for "Despacito" on YouTube received its one billionth view on April 20, 2017, after 97 days, becoming the second-fastest video on the site to reach the milestone behind Adele's "Hello". By August 2017, the song was the most viewed YouTube video with 2.9 billion views. Despacito is also the first and fastest video to hit 3, 4, 5, 6 and 7 billion views. The song soared into the top 10 of the Billboard Hot 100 following a Justin Bieber remix. The song also peaked at number 1 for 16 weeks, tying Mariah Carey and Boyz II Men's "One Sweet Day".
- "Dilbar" – a remake of 1999 Bollywood song of the same name. Being sung by Neha Kakkar, Dhvani Bhanushali and Ikka in Hindi, it features Arabic, Middle Eastern and Moroccan influences. The video features Nora Fatehi performing Arabic Belly dance. A remix version of the song, in three languages: Arabic, French and Hindi was later released, sung by Moroccan-Canadian actress Nora Fatehi in collaboration with Moroccan hip hop group Fnaïre.
- "Gangnam Style" – a song and music video by South Korean rapper Psy, showing him doing an "invisible horse dance" and saying the catchphrase "Oppa Gangnam Style" across a number of quirky locations, leading to its viral spread as well as the single's reaching international music charts. On YouTube, the video was the first to reach 1 and 2 billion views, and on November 24, 2012, became the most watched video, surpassing Justin Bieber's "Baby" until it was surpassed by Wiz Khalifa's "See You Again" on July 10, 2017.
- "God's Plan" – a viral song made by Canadian rapper Drake. The lyrics, as well as some of the good deeds Drake did throughout the music video, allowed for it to go viral and become a meme. The song peaked at number one on the Billboard Hot 100.
- "Golden" – a song by the fictional group Huntrix, from the movie KPop Demon Hunters, which was released on Netflix on June 20, 2025. The song blew up worldwide and broke many charts records.
- "Gucci Gang" – a song and music video by American rapper Lil Pump. The song's repetitive hook, which repeats the title of the song several times, led to the song becoming an Internet meme with other people making edits of the song. The song also peaked at number 3 on the Billboard Hot 100.
- "Havana" – a song by Camila Cabello named after the Cuban city of where she was born. The song is the first song by a female artist since 1996 to top 3 multiple charts on Billboard. The song also peaked at number one on the Billboard Hot 100.
- "Hello" – Adele's song released in October 2015 was a major digital commercial success, being the first song to sell 1 million units within a week of its release. Its video, which primarily features Adele's singing through a telephone conversation, led to several mashups with other songs, including Lionel Richie's song of the same name, which had a similar theme to its video. The video holds the record for the fastest time to reach one billion views on YouTube, reaching this within 88 days of its release, and currently has over 3.2 billion views.
- "High Hopes" – a song by Panic! at the Disco.
- "Hot Nigga" – a song by American rapper Bobby Shmurda. It became popular among Vine users in 2014 and led to the Shmoney dance meme, which has been performed by both Beyoncé and NFL receiver Brandon Gibson. The line "About a week ago!" was also heavily featured in the vines.
- "Hotline Bling" – a song and video by Drake released in October 2015; the video primarily consists of Drake dancing with female performers against brightly lit backgrounds. Drake's dance style was considered "goofy" and like that "of a total fool".
- "How You Like That" – a song by South Korean girl group Blackpink released in June 2020. The song's music video broke the records for the biggest music video premiere on YouTube, with 1.66 million concurrent viewers, and the most-watched music video within 24 hours, with 86.3 million views in its first day. It became the fastest video to reach 100 million views, in just 32 hours, and 200 million views, in seven days. The song's music video hit 1 billion views in February 2022.
- "Kill This Love" – a song by South Korean girl group Blackpink released in April 2019. The song's music video broke the records for the biggest music video premiere on YouTube, with 979,000 million concurrent viewers, and the most-watched music video within 24 hours, with 56.7 million views in its first day. It became the fastest video to reach 100 million views, in two days and 14 hours. In September 2024, the music video passed 2 billion views.
- "Lahore" – a Punjabi Indi-pop single by Guru Randhawa released in December 2017. It was later remade for Street Dancer 3D by the name of "Lagdi Lahore Di" and sung by Guru Randhawa and Tulsi Kumar.
- "Laung Laachi" – a Punjabi title song of the movie Laung Laachi became the most viewed song video in India in December 2019, as well as the first music video to hit more than 1 billion views. It is also the most viewed T-Series video (uploaded on 'T-Series Apna Punjab').
- "Let It Go" – A song by Idina Menzel as the character Queen Elsa, from the 2013 Disney film Frozen. The song went globally famous and had a huge impact.
- ""LM3ALLEM" - a song and video by Saad Lamjarred released on 2 May 2015. In 2022, it became the first Arabic song to reach 1 billion views on YouTube, making the most-watched music video from Morocco and the Arab World.
- "Look What You Made Me Do" – a song and video by Taylor Swift released on August 27, 2017. The song's music video broke the record for most-watched music video within 24 hours by achieving 43.2 million views on YouTube in its first day, topping the 27.7 million views Adele's "Hello" attracted in that timeframe, making it the third most viewed online video in the first 24 hours.
- "Never Gonna Give You Up"– a song and video by Rick Astley which is shared through Rickrolling where someone sends the link for the music video to another user disguised as a different link. The song amassed 1 billion views in July 2021.
- "Old Town Road" – a song by Lil Nas X that gained popularity in early 2019. It has since become a challenge on TikTok, under the "Yeehaw Challenge". The song has received support from Justin Bieber, was played after Texas Tech's win in the NCAA tournament, and played at an Atlanta Hawks basketball game. The song peaked at number one on the Billboard Hot 100, as well in many other countries. Its longevity on top of the Billboard Hot 100 has made it one of only 12 singles to peak at number one for 13+ weeks. A remix with country singer Billy Ray Cyrus was later released, boosting the songs popularity even more. The remix audio has surpassed 550 million views on YouTube. Both versions of the song have made Road the most streamed song in a week in the US with over 143 million streams, surpassing Drake's "In My Feelings" with 116.2 million streams. A music video released later starts off in 1889 and transitions into 2019. The music video also features several cameos.
- "Roar" – a 2013 song by American singer Katy Perry. This song became globally famous and topped the charts in many countries.
- "See You Again" – the official soundtrack of the 2015 film Furious 7 sung by Wiz Khalifa and Charlie Puth. The song was a tribute to Paul Walker, as he died during the production of Furious 7. The song became very popular, getting to 1 billion views in only 181 days. The song was also briefly the most viewed YouTube video, until it was surpassed by Despacito 24 days later.
- "Single Ladies (Put a Ring on It)" – a song and video released by Beyoncé in October 2008. The music video, shot in black and white, features Beyoncé wearing a one-shoulder black leotard surrounded by two backup dancers performing the choreography that would lead to the video's popularity. The video is credited with starting the "first major dance craze of both the new millennium and the Internet". Many celebrities have parodied and paid homage to the song and the video, including former President Barack Obama, Tom Hanks, Joe Jonas, Kourtney Kardashian, Khloé Kardashian, and Kim Kardashian, and Chris Colfer and Heather Morris included the dance routine as part of Glee Live! In Concert!
- "Tenda Biru" – a song by Indonesian actress Desy Ratnasari. It became viral in 2016, when she eventually popularized the Mannequin Challenge in the past.
- "Thank U, Next" – a 2018 song by Ariana Grande; its music video was released on November 30. The song topped the Billboard Hot 100. The video reached 100 million views in 3 days and 10 hours, becoming one of the fastest to do so. It also reached 55.4 million views within 24 hours, breaking both the YouTube and Vevo 24 hour records. The music video features celebrities Kris Jenner, Colleen Ballinger, Jonathan Bennett, Stefanie Drummond, Scott Nicholson, Troye Sivan and Gabi DeMartino. It referenced the movies Mean Girls, Bring It On, 13 Going on 30 and Legally Blonde.
- "The Duck Song" – a 2009 children's song by Bryant Oden accompanying an animated music video by forrestfire101 that went viral shortly after its release on YouTube. Within three years the video received nearly 90 million views. The series ended in October 2024 with Part 5.
- "The Fox (What Does the Fox Say?)" – a 2013 song and associated video by the Norwegian comedy duo Ylvis prepared for their television show. The song's verses note the noises other animals make; the chorus asks what noise a fox makes, at which point the song offers nonsense phrases like "gering-ding-ding-ding-dingeringeding!" and "fraka-kaka-kaka-kaka-kow!", while the video takes a similarly funny turn. The video saw over 43 million hits within a few weeks of its release, topping music charts, and leading to Ylvis being signed for more music by Warner Bros. Records.
- "The Gummy Bear Song" – a bubblegum dance song by Gummibär became a viral sensation and was the first song by a German independent artist to gain 1 billion views, and it currently has over 3.7 billion views.
- "This Is America" – a viral song by Childish Gambino. The video talks about the state of America. The way Glover walks in the beginning is representative of Jim Crow. His movements represent minstrel shows, a form of entertainment that mocks African-American people. The video also references the 2015 Charleston church massacre, the use of phones to record police officers shooting blacks, the Book of Revelation, other things relating to cars, and Get Out. The video surpassed 12.9 million views in under 24 hours, and 50 million in 3 days.
- "Tiba-Tiba" - a song by Indonesian musician Quinn Salman.
- "Turn Down for What" – a 2014 song and video by record producer DJ Snake and rapper Lil Jon. It gained viral popularity due to its bass drop after Lil Jon yells "Turn Down For What!".
- "Watch Me (Whip/Nae Nae)" – a video by Silentó with unique moves imitated by other fans, making it go viral in 2015. The song peaked at No. 3 on the Billboard Hot 100 chart.
- "Yummy" – a 2020 single by singer Justin Bieber from his album "Changes", which became famous for its catchy and repetitive lyrics, and because of conspiracy theories linking the song to "Pizzagate".

== Other music videos ==
=== Originals ===
- "1-800-273-8255" – a song by Logic featuring Alessia Cara and Khalid mainly focusing on the topic of suicide and suicide prevention. Its title is a direct reference to the United States National Suicide Prevention Lifeline's phone number, although as of 2022 the Lifeline is known as the 988 Suicide & Crisis Lifeline as its number is now 988. In 2021, the Lifeline reported that calls soared 50% after Logic performed the song at the 2017 MTV Video Music Awards and that suicides among 10- to 19-year-olds dropped by 5.5 percent between June 1, 2017 (34 days after the song was released) and the 2018 Grammy Awards, where the song was performed live once more.
- "2 Phút Hơn" – a 2020 Vinahouse house song by Pháo. Several remixes of the song were made. One by DJ/producer Kaiz was released on November 28, 2020, and gained global popularity, one of a number of Vietnamese songs to become popular on TikTok through its dance covers.
- "Badgers" – a viral song and video by Jonti Picking featuring badgers jumping up and down accompanied with catchy lyrics. The dancing badgers helped Picking's website Weebl's Stuff win a People's Choice award from users of Yahoo! in the UK.
- "Bed Intruder Song" – a remix by the Gregory Brothers of a televised news interview of Antoine Dodson, the brother of a victim of a home invasion and attempted assault. The music video became a mainstream success, reaching the Billboard Hot 100, and became the most watched YouTube video of 2010. The video also coined the phrase "Hide yo kids, hide yo wife," which later became a meme.
- "Bitch Lasagna" – a song by Swedish YouTuber Pewdiepie in collaboration with Dutch music producer Party In Backyard. The song satirizes Indian music label T-Series and uses racism and stereotypes of Indians as a response to predictions that T-Series would surpass PewDiePie in terms of subscriber count, which soon became true. The video was later banned in India by Delhi High Court. The song was one of the first events in the PewDiePie vs T-Series competition, in which the two channels competed for the title of the most-subscribed channel on YouTube.
- "Chacarron Macarron" – a song by Panamanian artists Rodney Clark (El Chombo) and Andres de la Cruz (also known as Andy's Val Gourmet). It is a reworking of the original version from 2003 by Andy's Val Gourmet, who is credited as 'Andy's Val' on the release. The song gained attention online when the chorus was used on a YTMND page by the name of "Ualuealuealeuale", which was created sometime in late 2005. "Chacarron Macarron" went viral on the Internet owing to its nonsensical lyrics and odd music video.
- "Chinese Food" – a song and music video by Alison Gold recorded with the controversial ARK Music Factory, the same company behind Rebecca Black's viral song "Friday". The song was called "The New Friday" and also called racist.
- "Chocolate Rain" – a song and music video written and performed by Tay Zonday (also known as Adam Nyerere Bahner). After being posted on YouTube on 22 April 2007, the song quickly became a popular viral video. By December 2009, the video had received over 40 million views.
- "Congratulations" – a song by Swedish YouTuber PewDiePie, Swedish singer/musician Roomie and English musician Boyinaband. The single was self-released on 31 March 2019 with an accompanying music video on YouTube as a response to T-Series surpassing PewDiePie as the most subscribed channel on YouTube. The music video is banned on YouTube India.
- "Crab Rave" – a song and music video written and animated by Irish DJ and music producer Eoin O'Broin (known by his stage name Noisestorm). Although the song was initially released as an April Fool's Day joke for the Canadian record label Monstercat, it soon gained popularity because of the music video featuring thousands of animated dancing crabs. The song peaked at number 32 in the "Hot Dance/Electronic Songs" category in the Billboard charts, surpassed over 1 million (U.S) online streams in the week ending November 22, 2018, and gained over 50 million views on the "Monstercat: Instinct" YouTube channel.
- "Da Coconut Nut" – a song by Filipino national artist Ryan Cayabyab originally popularized by the band Smokey Mountain in 1991.
- "Don't Drop That Thun Thun" – a song and viral video by The FiNATTiCZ. The song became popular due to a twerking mashup of it posted on Vine. The song peaked at No. 35 on the Billboard Hot 100.
- "Firework" (Katy Perry and Jodi DiPiazza duet) – a duet from the television special Night of Too Many Stars, it received 4 million views in the first four days.
- "Friday" – a 2011 music video sung by 13-year-old Rebecca Black, partially funded by her mother, received over 200 million views on YouTube and spread in popularity through social media services.
- "Gokuraku Jodo" – a J-pop song by Japanese pop duo Garnidelia. The song was released on July 28, 2016, accompanied with a dance music video. It spread to the Chinese video website Bilibili and quickly became viral in China, leading to various spoofs and mimicking dances.
- "Gwiyomi" – a K-pop single by the South Korean indie musician Hari. The song, released on 18 February 2013, is based on an Internet meme known as the Gwiyomi Player, which was invented in October 2012 by the K-pop idol Jung Il Hoon. It has inspired many similar versions by Asian netizens.
- "I Feel Fantastic" – A music video starring a singing human animatronic named Tara the Android, created by John Bergeron in 2004 to be "the world's first pop star android" and featured in a set of music videos meant to promote the animatronic titled, "Android Music Videos, Vol. 1". One of the videos, Please, was reuploaded to YouTube in 2009 under the name I Feel Fantastic.
- "It's Everyday Bro" – a song by actor and YouTube personality Jake Paul that went viral due to a line by Nick Crompton, who stated that England was a city. The video has become the seventeenth most disliked YouTube video.
- "Lolly Bomb" – an official music video by Russian rave band Little Big. It featured the fictional love story of Howard X, an impersonator of Kim Jong-Un, where he fell in love with a missile.
- "Manike Mage Hithe" – a viral cover of a Sri Lankan song, sung by Yohani and Satheeshan Rathnayaka. It received widespread recognition in Sri Lanka, India and abroad.
- "Mesmerizer" – a 2024 Vocaloid song written by 32ki and sung by virtual singers Hatsune Miku and Kasane Teto. The song's music video was created by Japanese animator "channel". Focusing on the topic of escapism, the song has inspired multiple covers and Internet memes.
- "Mine" – a viral song and meme by Bazzi. The video created the meme "You so fuckin' precious when you smile" from a lyric in the song. The song also peaked at number 11 on the Billboard Hot 100.
- OK Go music videos – several of the band's award-winning videos incorporate unique concepts, such as dancing on treadmills in "Here It Goes Again", a giant Rube Goldberg machine in "This Too Shall Pass", and a choreographed one-shot routine using over a dozen trained dogs in "White Knuckles". OK Go's videos often go viral within a few days of their release. Their music video for "The Muppet Show Theme Song" won a Webby Award for "Viral Video" in 2012.
- "One Pound Fish" – a sales pitch song written and sung by Muhammad Shahid Nazir, a fish stall vendor in London, that became a viral hit and led to Nazir getting a recording contract.
- "Pants on the Ground" – first sung by "General" Larry Platt during the season 9 auditions of American Idol in Atlanta, Georgia, on 13 January 2010. Within one week, the video had about 5 million views on YouTube, had over 1 million fans on Facebook, and was repeated on television by Jimmy Fallon and Brett Favre.
- "Red Solo Cup" – Toby Keith's recording of a drinking song devoted to the Solo disposable cup became a viral hit, with the video gathering 4 million views on YouTube in November 2011.
- "Shia LaBeouf Live" – a song by singer-songwriter Rob Cantor that depicts Shia LaBeouf as a cannibal who kills people for sport. Due to the ridiculous manner of the song, it went viral.

- "United Breaks Guitars" – a video by the band Sons of Maxwell, recounting how United Airlines broke a guitar belonging to band member Dave Carroll. The video reached 11 million views, was named one of the top ten of 2009, and created speculation that it had caused a $180 million drop in the airline's stock value.
- "What What (In the Butt)" – a viral music video set to a song about anal sex by gay recording artist Samwell. The video was posted on Valentine's Day 2007, and two weeks later had been viewed 500,000 times. It was subsequently parodied on the South Park episode "Canada on Strike", which poked fun at several other Internet memes and personalities.

=== Interpretations ===
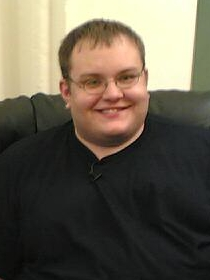
Gary Brolsma, aka "The Numa Numa guy"

- "Kids with Down syndrome singing A Thousand Years" — A viral interpretation of "A Thousand Years" sung by kids with Down syndrome. The video was shared on Twitter by the song's author, Christina Perri. The video was made for World Down Syndrome Day.
- "Canon Rock" – A rock arrangement of Canon in D by JerryC that became famous when covered by funtwo and others.
- "Can You Send Me 30K?" – A viral Arknights: Endfield fan animation created by Simi and Chapchap in January 2026 amid the game's PayPal issue. It features the Endfield characters Perlica asking Chen to send her $30,000, with Chen not having not much money, eventually leading to them dancing to various currencies of $30,000. It gained popularity within and outside the Arknights: Endfield community across a wide range of social media platforms less than a week after it was uploaded and was even used as an official advertisement for the game, therefore receiving an internet meme status while also spawning variants and various parodies of the meme showcasing different characters from different video games.
- "Funk do Mortal Kombat" – A remix of "Techno Syndrome" on funk carioca style. It was published on 30 March 2011 by Funk You Bit and it became popular on Brazilian YouTube.
- "Hey Clip" – On August 24, 2005, 22-year-old Israeli female film school students in Ramle, Tasha (Lital) Mizel and Adi "Dishka" Frimmerman, uploaded a playful, entertaining lip-sync video of the song "Hey" by the Pixies, released on the band's Doolittle album in 1989. "There were no global ambitions when they shot the video in Mizel's bedroom during a sleepover ... they made the clip as a birthday present for Frimmerman's boyfriend," the Jerusalem Post said.
- "Howard The Alien" – A green screen video of an alien dancing to Money Longer by Lil Uzi Vert. The original was uploaded to YouTube by the "3D Animation Land" channel in December 2017. It began gaining attention when an iFunny post combined the animation with Money Longer with the caption "imagine having sleep paralysis and seeing this as the foot of bed just fuckin breakin it down and you cant do anything about it like you hear the music in the back and everything bruh."
- "I Dreamed a Dream" by Susan Boyle – In 2009, Boyle, an unknown singer, 47 at the time, auditioned for Britain's Got Talent with the song, surprising the jury, the public and the world with her interpretation. The programme received high ratings, and Boyle's performance was quickly added to sites such as YouTube, where millions viewed it in the first month alone.
- "Marhaban Tiba" — A viral interpretation of "Ramadan Tiba" sung by Indonesian singer Iis Dahlia.
- "The Muppets: Bohemian Rhapsody" – A 2009 music video featuring The Muppets performing a modified version of Queen's "Bohemian Rhapsody". The video received over seven million hits within its first week of release on YouTube, and by 2012, it earned over 25 million hits. The video won the "Viral Video" category in the 14th Annual Webby Awards.
- MoeChakkaFire – A song by issey that was released in 2024 that is based around the Zenless Zone Zero character Ellen Joe. The music video on YouTube received over 1 million views within the first two weeks of its release and went viral to the point it was covered by multiple artists and was used in a large number of TikTok videos, therefore receiving an internet meme status. It ranked first on the Billboard Japan Heatseekers Songs from September 23 to 29, 2024 and ranked third on Spotify's "Daily Viral Songs (Japan). The song was covered by Ellen's Japanese voice actress Shion Wakayama in 2025 and was featured on the HoYoFair program to coincide with Zenless Zone Zero's first anniversary.
- "Numa Numa" with Gary Brolsma, a video of Romanian song "Dragostea Din Tei" by O-Zone. The video, released December 6, 2004, on Newgrounds.com, shows Brolsma lip syncing the hit song with lively gesticulations and dance moves.
- "Pop Culture" – A 2011 YouTube video of a live mash-up by the musician Hugo Pierre Leclercq aka "Madeon", age 17 at the time, using a Novation touchpad to mix samples from 39 different songs. The video went viral within a few days of being posted, and led to Leclercq's fame in the electronica music genre.
- "Rabbit Hole" – A 2023 Vocaloid song by Deco*27 whose derivative work of the song animated by channelcastation went viral in 2024 and spawned various internet memes.
- "Redbone" by girl selling Girl Scout cookies – A video by a 6-year-old girl and her father trying to sell Girl Scout cookies. The popularity of the song led to sales of her cookies skyrocketing. The girl appeared on The Late Show with Stephen Colbert with the artist of the original song, Donald Glover.

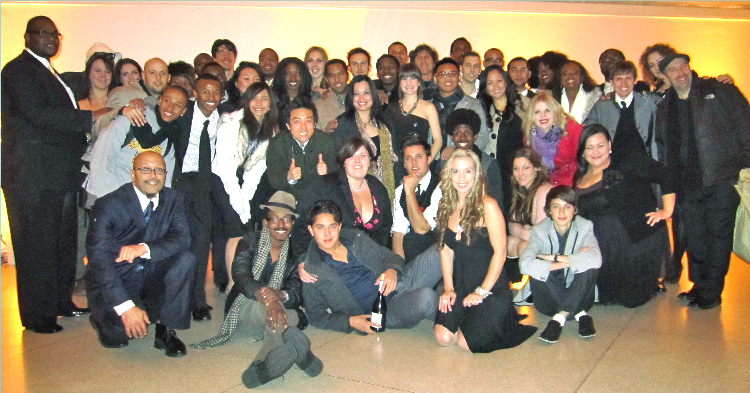
YouTube musicians from Lisa Lavie's online collaboration video "We Are the World 25 for Haiti (YouTube Edition)" met on the same stage for a live reunion performance ten months later in Washington, D.C.

- "Space Oddity" by Canadian astronaut Chris Hadfield – Performed and recorded during a space mission on Soyuz TMA-07M. The cover of the famous David Bowie song is set in zero gravity against spectacular views of Earth with Hadfield singing and playing the guitar. The video generated a great deal of media exposure.
- "Twelve Days of Christmas" by a cappella group Straight No Chaser went viral in 2007 and led to the group being signed by Atlantic Records.
- "We Are the World 25 for Haiti (YouTube edition)" is a massively collaborative crowdsourced charity video, involving 57 geographically distributed unsigned or independent contributors. It was produced by Canadian singer-songwriter and YouTube personality Lisa Lavie to raise money for victims of the 2010 Haiti earthquake. The video received repeated coverage on CNN, and its participants were collectively named ABC News "Persons of the Week" by television journalist Diane Sawyer in March 2010.
- "Yodeling Walmart Boy" — A video of Mason Ramsey yodeling to Lovesick Blues in his local Walmart. The song and video went viral and led him to become a celebrity. This version made the original song peak at number 3 on the Spotify Top 50 viral charts. The song also led Mason to be on The Ellen DeGeneres Show, have a concert at his own Walmart, and perform at the Coachella Valley Music and Arts Festival.
- "Xue hua piao piao bei feng xiao xiao" — A selfie video of a bald Chinese man singing the chorus verse of Fei Yu-ching's song Yi jian mei in a snowy background, first uploaded to Kuaishou in January 2020. Shared to Western social media, it quickly went viral on TikTok and Spotify by May 2020, leading to various covers and spoofs.

=== Ads and campaigns ===
- "Dumb Ways to Die" – A music video featuring "a variety of cute characters killing themselves in increasingly idiotic ways" that went viral through sharing and social media. It was part of a public service announcement advertisement campaign by Metro Trains in Melbourne, Australia to promote rail safety.
- Mandatory Fun album and the #8days8videos campaign – A viral marketing campaign by comedy singer/songwriter "Weird Al" Yankovic to promote his 2014 album Mandatory Fun. He released eight videos for the new album over eight consecutive days across different streaming providers. The approach was considered very successful, leading to the album becoming Yankovic's first number one hit in his 32-year career. It also became the first comedy album to hit Number 1 on the Billboard charts in over 50 years.
- Beat Energy Gap – A 2017 advertisement originally produced by Nestlé Philippines to promote the product MILO, with actor James Reid as the endorser. The success of the advertisement and the song's catchy lyrics and upbeat theme.

=== Dance phenomena ===
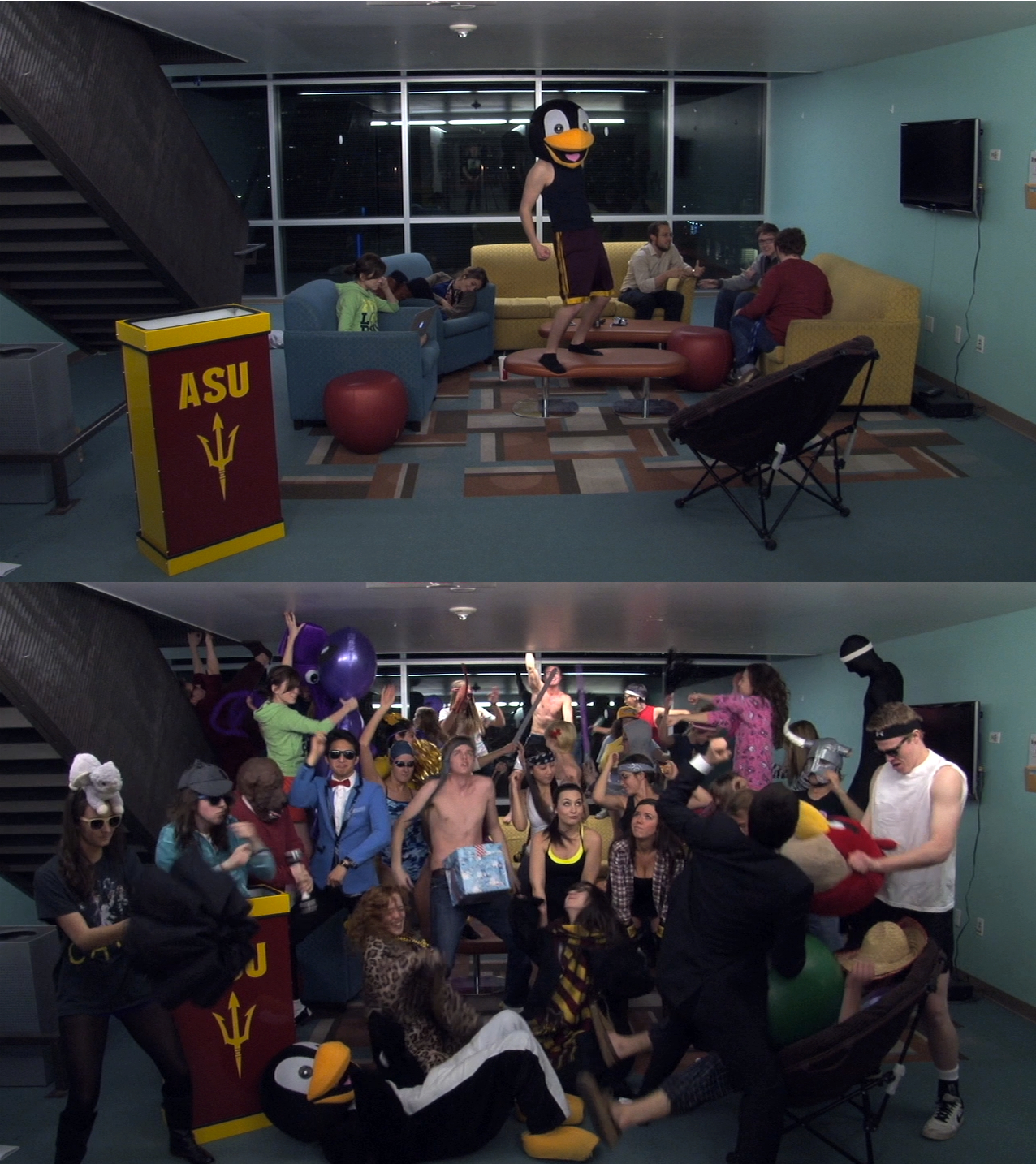
Two screenshots from before and after the drop in a Harlem Shake video

- "Crank That (Soulja Boy)" – Debut single by American rapper Soulja Boy (2007) accompanied by the "Soulja Boy dance". The song is recognized by its looping steel drum riff. The song peaked at number one on the Billboard Hot 100.
- "STOOPID (6ix9ine)" – Single by American rapper 6ix9ine, accompanied by the "STOOPID dance". The song was used in many memes, and also became a viral dance challenge on TikTok.
- "Dancing Banana" – An animated banana dancing to the song "Peanut Butter Jelly Time" by the Buckwheat Boyz.
- Ghetto Kids of Uganda dancing "Sitya Loss" – A viral song of Ugandan singer Eddy Kenzo. It featured four Ugandan boys – Alex Ssempijja, Fred and Isaac Tumusiime, and Bashir Lubega – and a girl, Patricia Nabakooza, dancing improvised moves in a competitive manner. The video, made by Big Talent Entertainment and JahLive Films, was directed by Mugerwa Frank.
- Hampster Dance – A page filled with hamsters dancing, linking to other animated pages. It spawned a fictional band complete with its own CD album release.
- Harlem Shake – A video based on Harlem shake dance, originally created by YouTube personality Filthy Frank and using an electronica version of the song by Baauer. In such videos, one person is dancing or acting strangely among a room full of others going about routine business, until after the drop and a video cut, when everyone starts dancing or acting strangely. Attempts to recreate the dance led to a viral spread on YouTube.
- "Hit the Quan" — A viral song by iLoveMemphis that started the #HitTheQuanChallenge, resulting in people dancing to the video. The song peaked at number 15 on the Billboard Hot 100.
- "Indian Thriller" – A viral scene from the Indian film Donga, with added subtitles phonetically approximating the original lyrics as English sentences.
- "In My Feelings"— A 2018 song by Drake. It went viral thanks to the "In My Feelings Challenge" (also known as the Do The Shiggy Challenge). The challenge was replicated by many celebrities, such as football player Odell Beckham Jr., actor Will Smith, hosts Kelly & Ryan from the talk show Live with Kelly and Ryan, and many others. The popularity of the dance challenge led to the song reaching the top of the Billboard Hot 100.
- JK Wedding Entrance Dance – The wedding procession for Jill Peterson and Kevin Heinz of St. Paul, Minnesota, choreographed to the song Forever by Chris Brown. The video reached 1.75 million views on YouTube in less than five days in 2009. The video was later imitated in an episode of The Office on NBC.
- "Juju on That Beat (TZ Anthem)" – A viral song and meme made by two Detroit teenagers, Zay Hilfigerrr & Zayion McCall. Many people have tried to replicate their dance moves, with the #TZAnthem Challenge. The song charted on the Billboard Hot 100, peaking at number 5.
- Little Superstar – A video of King kong, a short Indian actor, break-dancing to MC Miker G & DJ Sven's remix of the Madonna song "Holiday", in a clip from a 1990 Tamil film, Adhisaya Piravi, featuring actor Rajnikanth.
- "Milly Rock" – A 2014 song by 2 Milly. It went viral in the summer of 2015 and has been utilized by football players in their celebrations and musicians such as Rihanna and Travis Scott.
- Passinho do Romano – The dance was born in the east of São Paulo, Brazil, known initially as Passinho do Romano because it was created in Jardim Romano in the region of Itaim Paulista. The dance consists of light steps, with soft uses of heels, free arms with break, dubstep, robot steps and funk.
- "Rolex" – Viral song made by duo Ayo & Teo. The song is accompanied with the #RolexChallenge, which features people trying to replicate the dance. The song peaked at number 20 on the Billboard Hot 100.
- Scooby Doo Papa — A viral song and dance video made by New York disc jockey DJ Kass. Many people have tried to recreate the dance on social media. The song peaked at number 9 on the Billboard Hot Latin chart.
- "Skibidi" – A song and viral music video by Russian rave band Little Big. The release sparked a dance craze in part due to the "Skibidi Challenge" issued by the band. The video went viral days after release, gaining 28 million views in two weeks.
- Techno Viking – A Nordic raver dancing in a technoparade in Berlin.
- "Thriller" by the CPDRC Dancing Inmates – A recreation of Michael Jackson's hit single "Thriller" performed by prisoners at the Cebu Provincial Detention and Rehabilitation Center (CPDRC) in the Philippines. In January 2010, it was among the ten most popular videos on YouTube, with over 20 million views.

=== Music phenomena ===
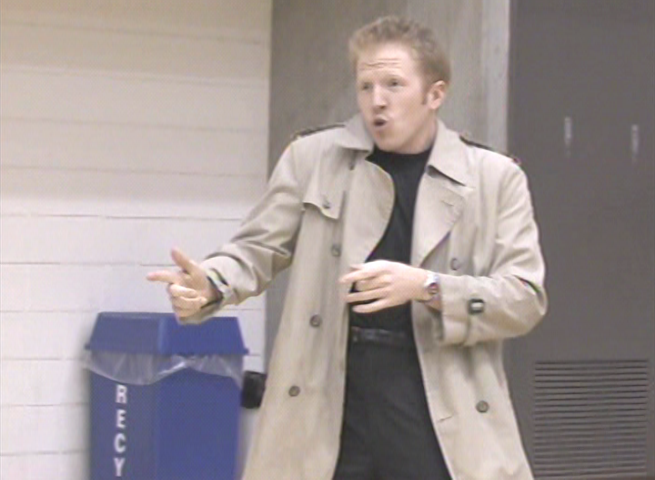
A Rick Astley impersonator rickrolling at a basketball game in 2008

- Anime Music Videos/MADs – A staple of anime conventions both in Japan and Western countries, these fan-made videos take footage from other anime works and re-edit them in separate order, adding new soundtracks (including to full-length songs), and making other manipulations such as lip-syncing characters to lyrics. With the propagation of the Internet and popularity of anime in the United States in 2003, this type of user-created content was extended to include footage from other works, including video games and Western/American animation.
- 80s remix – A series of videos in which contemporary pop music is reinterpreted as songs released during the 1980s.
- Sergey Stepanov, aka Epic Sax Guy – A Moldovan musician who quickly gained Internet attention after performing in the Eurovision Song Contest 2010 as part of the SunStroke Project. The performance of Stepanov miming a saxophone solo of Moldova's entry has been remixed and looped for ten hours. The group embraced the Internet attention and mentioned 'Epic Sax Guy' in some of their singles, including a single called 'Epic Sax'. In the 2017 contest, SunStroke Project returned with Stepanov, who later played the signature riff live during an interview.
- Hurra Torpedo – A Norwegian band whose coast-to-coast tour was a viral campaign to promote the Ford Fusion car.
- Lip dub – Although lip dubbing in music videos was not a new concept, Jake Lodwick, the co-founder of Vimeo, coined the term "lip dubbing" on December 14, 2006, in a video titled Lip Dubbing: Endless Dream. Lodwick subsequently directed the "Flagpole Sitta" "office lip dub" in April 2007, which The Washington Post covered. Since then, dozens of lip dubs have been coordinated around the world by students. After L'Université du Québec à Montréal (UQAM) produced a lip dub to The Black Eyed Peas' "I Gotta Feeling" in 2009, the video phenomenon gained international acclaim.
- Lucian Piane, aka RevoLucian – Created several popular celebrity techno remixes, including a spoof of actor Christian Bale titled "Bale Out".
- Literal music video – Covers of music videos in which the original lyrics have been replaced with lyrics that literally describe the events in the video, typically disconnected with the original lyrics of the song.
- Nightcore – A type of music that started as a subgenre of trance, nightcore is characterized by a sped-up melody (sometimes), fast rhythmic beat (usually), and always higher than normal pitch. Almost all nightcore works are original songs remixed by fans. Nightcore, introduced in 2002, began its spread to the internet in mid-2005.
- "Pink Season" – An album by artist and YouTube personality Filthy Frank, under his "Pink Guy" persona. The album consists of various tracks that are often overly vulgar and comedic. The album went viral on its release and soared to the top of the iTunes charts.
- Rickrolling – A phenomenon involving posting a URL in an Internet forum that appears to be relevant to the topic at hand, but is actually a link to a video of Rick Astley's "Never Gonna Give You Up". The practice originated on 4chan as a "Duckroll", in which the link was to an image of a duck on wheels. The practice of Rickrolling became popular after April Fools' Day in 2008, when YouTube rigged every feature video on its home page to Astley's video.
- "Sandstorm" – A phenomenon involving answering a question about a song's name, in the comments to a YouTube video, with Darude's 1999 song "Sandstorm", no matter what the song in the video is.
- 009 Sound System – An electronic music project by Alexander Perls that gained popularity on YouTube after its implementation of the AudioSwap system on the website, which replaced copyrighted music with a Creative Commons licensed track. Since the track names were in alphabetical sorting, 009 Sound System tracks were first on the list, which made them the most used. Popular tracks included "With a Spirit", "Dreamscape", "Holy Ghost", "Space and Time" and others. During the AudioSwap era of YouTube, users reacted negatively to these songs being very frequent on the site, but in YouTube's later days, "With a Spirit" became for many users the site's unofficial anthem.

=== Others ===
- "All Star" – A song by rock band Smash Mouth known for its appearance in the 2001 film Shrek and its opening line "Somebody once told me". The song became a meme often associated with Shrek. The song has also been a large part of mashup culture, often being mashed up with various songs. The band has embraced the song's memes.
- "Baby I'm Yours" – A song by Breakbot typically coupled with "Ladies and Gentlemen, We Got Him", a quote originally uttered by American diplomat Paul Bremer during a 2003 press conference announcing the capture of Saddam Hussein. The song began to be widely used in various remixes on YouTube paired with clips of people being apprehended or caught off-guard in some fashion, often in the context of FBI operations or ligma jokes.
- "Big Enough" – An EDM country song by Kirin J. Callinan. The music video for the song portrays Jimmy Barnes as a giant screaming cowboy in the sky. The video went viral when the sound of Barnes screaming was put over other screams in pop culture.
- "Chum Drum Bedrum" – A video of Russian singer Vitas performing the 7th Element. The video went viral due to Vitas singing gibberish such as "Blr ha ha ha", which led to Vitas being known as "The Weird Russian Singer".
- "Father Stretch My Hands Pt. 1" – A song by rapper Kanye West. Metro Boomin's signature producer tag, "If Young Metro don't trust you I'm gonna shoot ya" and entrance inspired various Vines and memes, usually involving somebody shooting a gun.
- "Fireflies" – A 2009 song by Owl City that in May 2017 was revived as a meme in which the song would play in random clips. The song received further notability in June 2017 when Owl City was asked to interpret the lyric "I get a thousand hugs from 10,000 lightning bugs."
- "For The Damaged Coda" – A 2000 song from alternative rock band Blonde Redhead, popularlized by animated television series Rick And Morty, spawned memes after the song was placed over sad moments in popular culture.
- "Lazy Sunday" – A 2005 Saturday Night Live sketch written and performed by Andy Samberg and Chris Parnell in which the two engage in a hip-hop song about their plans for a lazy Sunday afternoon. The song was uploaded by fans to YouTube, at that time a relatively small, new site, and was watched by millions of users before it was taken down as a copyright violation by NBC. This created the idea of being able to provide reuse of television material on the Internet, giving shows a second life, and is said to have established YouTube as a potential revenue source for television networks, contributing toward Google's purchase of the site for $1.6 billion in 2006.
- "Little Dark Age" – A 2018 song by American rock band MGMT. Starting late 2020, the song saw a surge in popularity due to remixes and samples being used in a series of video edits featuring themes of politics, social justice, war, and history.
- "Man's Not Hot" – A freestyle rap by British comedian Michael Dapaah. The freestyle features Dapaah saying unintelligible phrases and words that made the video into a meme, which was remixed with various songs.
- "Mooo!" – A 2018 novelty song by American rapper Doja Cat, who sings, "Bitch I'm a cow / I'm not a cat / I don't say meow". The music video was filmed with a green screen made out of a bed sheet.
- "Nyan Cat" – A video of an animated cat running through space, accompanied with a UTAU song whose lyrics are simply "Nyanyanyanyanyanyanya!". The video went viral after bloggers started reposting the song.
- "Pokemon Go Song" – A song by YouTube personality Mishovy Silenosti about the augmented reality mobile game Pokémon Go. The video surpassed 2.5 million views and became one of the most disliked YouTube videos.
- "Pokémon Theme Music Video" – A video featuring Ian Hecox and Anthony Padilla lip syncing to the original English Pokémon theme song. The video became the most viewed video on YouTube at the time before it was removed. The success of their Pokémon video and other videos led Smosh to be featured in the "Person of the Year: You" issue of Time Magazine, published December 13, 2006 and on Time.com.
- "PPAP (Pen-Pineapple-Apple-Pen)" – A Japanese earworm-style music video performed by Pikotaro.
- "Redbone" – A 2016 song by music artist Childish Gambino. In early 2017, the song became a popular meme consisting of various remixes of the song to fit a certain theme.
- "Rose's Turn" – a song from the 1959 musical Gypsy. The song later saw a resurgence in 2024 where a version of the song covered in the TV show Glee saw usage on the social media platform TikTok.
- "Shooting Stars" – A 2009 song by Australian band Bag Raiders that went viral in 2017. The song is usually accompanied with people falling with surreal, spacey backgrounds. The meme has since been acknowledged by the band.
- "Super Max!" – A 2016 song by Dutch Max Verstappen fan group The Pitstop Boys. The song and music video gained popularity during Verstappen's 2021 title run in Formula One.
- Trololo – A 1976 televised performance of Russian singer Eduard Khil lip syncing the song I Am Glad to Finally Be Home (Я очень рад, ведь я, наконец, возвращаюсь домой). The video's first mainstream appearance was on The Colbert Report, on 3 March 2010; since then, its popularity has escalated, occasionally being used as part of a bait-and-switch prank, similar to Rickrolling.
- To Be Continued – A series of short clips set to "Roundabout" by the progressive rock band Yes culminating with a "To Be Continued" card for humorous effect. This is parody of a standard ending of the anime JoJo's Bizarre Adventure.
- "Tunak Tunak Tun" – A 1998 song by Indian artist Daler Mehndi. The music video of the song features multiple images of Mehndi green screened over computer-generated landscape images. This was done because critics complained that Mehndi's music was popular only because his music videos featured beautiful women dancing. Mehndi's response was to create a video that featured only himself.
- "What I've Done" – A 2007 song by American rock band Linkin Park. It became an internet meme in 2022 when the song was used as a template for various films "but [if] it came out in 2007", inspired by its usage in the closing scene of the 2007 science fiction film Transformers.
- "When Mama Isn't Home" – A video of a father playing trombone and a son playing an oven door to the song 'Freaks' by Timmy Trumpet and the rapper Savage. The October 2014 video went viral on Vine and YouTube. The father and son appeared on morning TV talk shows and traveled to Europe to film a TV commercial for Hewlett Packard. The song reached the Billboard viral charts Top 10, 6× platinum status in Australia and number 1 in Savage's home country, New Zealand.
- "We Are Number One"– A 2014 song by Stefán Karl Stefánsson (in character as Robbie Rotten) from the children's show LazyTown. In late 2016, the song went viral after Stefánsson was diagnosed with pancreatic cancer.
- The Most Mysterious Song on the Internet – A New wave song that aired on a German radio station in 1984, thought to originate from a European band. The mission to find the song gained popularity in 2019 after a Brazilian Reddit user asked the website if they knew of the song's origins. In November 2024, the song was identified as 'Subways of Your Mind' and traced back to 1980's new wave band Fex.
- Cbat – A 2011 song that became popular after a Reddit user stated that he used the song during sex and his girlfriend was turned off by it.

== See also ==
- Internet meme
- List of Internet phenomena
- List of viral videos
- Viral marketing
