= R U Professional =

2009 song performed by The Mae Shi

Song by The Mae Shi
- Published: YouTube, MediaFire
- Released: February 3, 2009
- Recorded: February 2, 2009, Los Angeles
- Genre: Electropop
- Length: 2:53
- Songwriter: The Mae Shi
- Producer: The Mae Shi

"R U Professional" is a 2009 satirical song by the American indie rock band The Mae Shi, inspired by a July 2008 outburst by actor Christian Bale on the set of Terminator Salvation. Bale was filming with actress Bryce Dallas Howard when he berated director of photography, Shane Hurlbut, for walking into his line of sight. An audio recording of the incident appeared on website TMZ on February 2, 2009. The Mae Shi composed and recorded the song later in the same day, and released it the next day. The group stated that the piece was created to honor Bale. The song parodies Bale by sampling his voice from the 2008 diatribe. The chorus incorporates Bale's use of the word professional from his flare-up. The lyrics reference several films the actor starred in, including Newsies, Swing Kids, American Psycho, and The Dark Knight.

The song was made available on YouTube and via download on MediaFire the next day. "R U Professional" received a generally positive reception, and was praised as an effective parody of Bale's on-set disturbance. MTV compared its style to new wave groups like Devo. The Los Angeles Times described it as a lively pop music tribute to the actor. USA Today categorized the song as fun dance music and called it creatively motivated. The Toronto Sun wrote positively of its creative lyrics and use of audio from the Bale oration. El País classed the piece as an electropop song that contributed to the viral spread of the Bale rant online. Dose placed the song within the genre of an electro jam session. Publications including The A.V. Club and Pitchfork Media were impressed with the group's ability to compose and release the song twenty-four hours after the audio of the incident appeared online. The Irish Independent wrote that they thought the group may have used a melody they already had and adapted it for the song to release it so quickly.

== Background ==
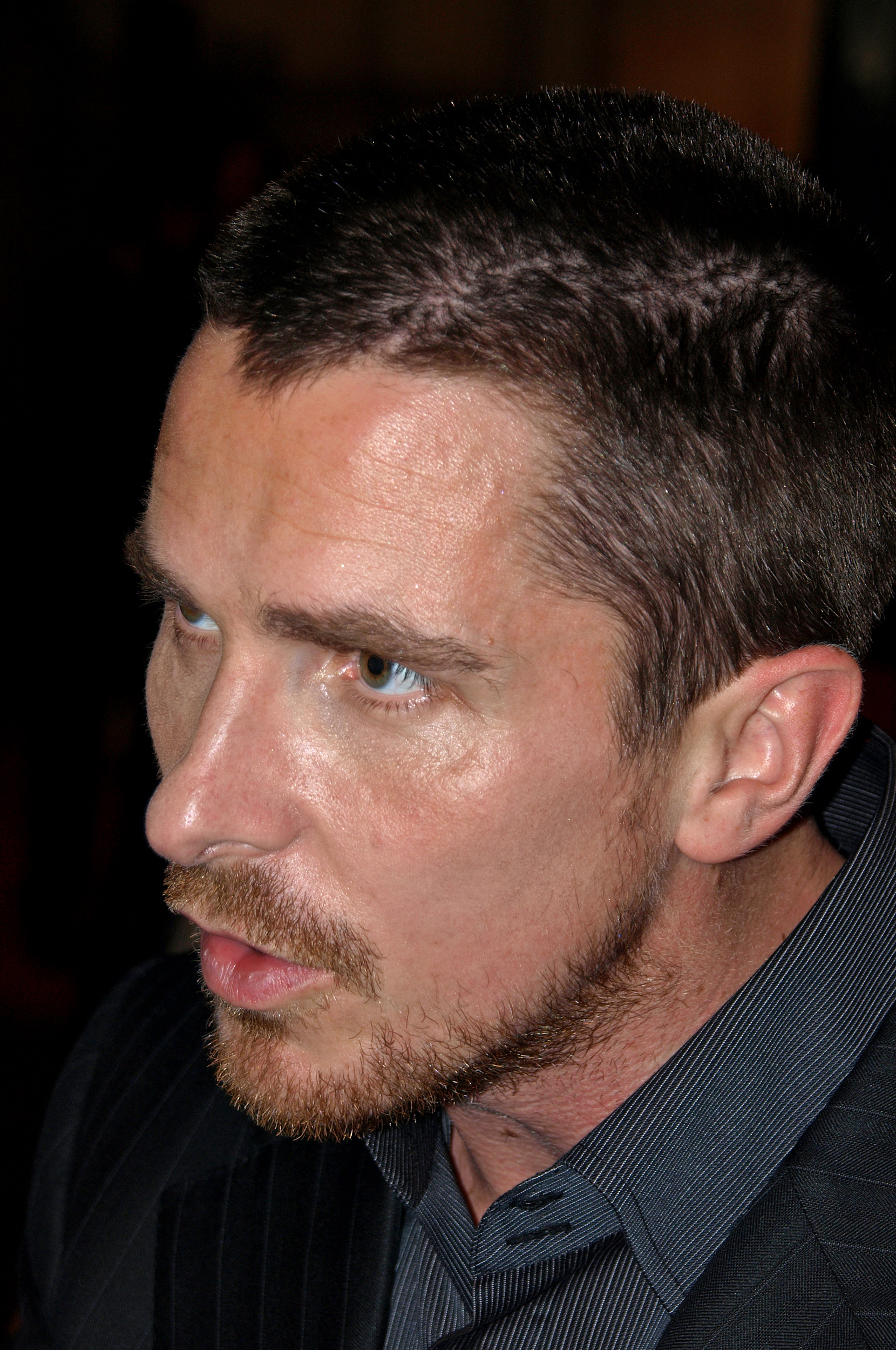
Christian Bale in July 2008

In July 2008, actor Christian Bale was immersed in shooting a scene for the film Terminator Salvation in New Mexico. While performing with actress Bryce Dallas Howard, Bale shouted at the film's director of photography, Shane Hurlbut, for walking into his line of sight. Hurlbut responded calmly, apologized to Bale, and continued shooting for seven hours after the incident.

An audio recording of the incident appeared on the website TMZ on February 2, 2009. During the four-minute audio recording, Bale can be heard shouting and swearing at Hurlbut and threatening to quit the film if Hurlbut did it again and was not fired. Prior to releasing the audio on the internet, TMZ had reported on the incident on their website in July 2008. TMZ reported that film executives for Terminator Salvation had sent a copy of the audio recording to the film's insurance company in case Bale quit the film.

In a statement to Los Angeles radio station KROQ-FM on February 6, 2009, Bale said he had behaved inappropriately, and that he and Hurlbut had talked after the incident and fully resolved the issue. Bale acknowledged that the two worked together for several hours after the incident, and for a month afterwards as well. He noted that he had viewed a draft version of the film and praised the cinematography work done by Hurlbut.

== Inspiration and composition ==
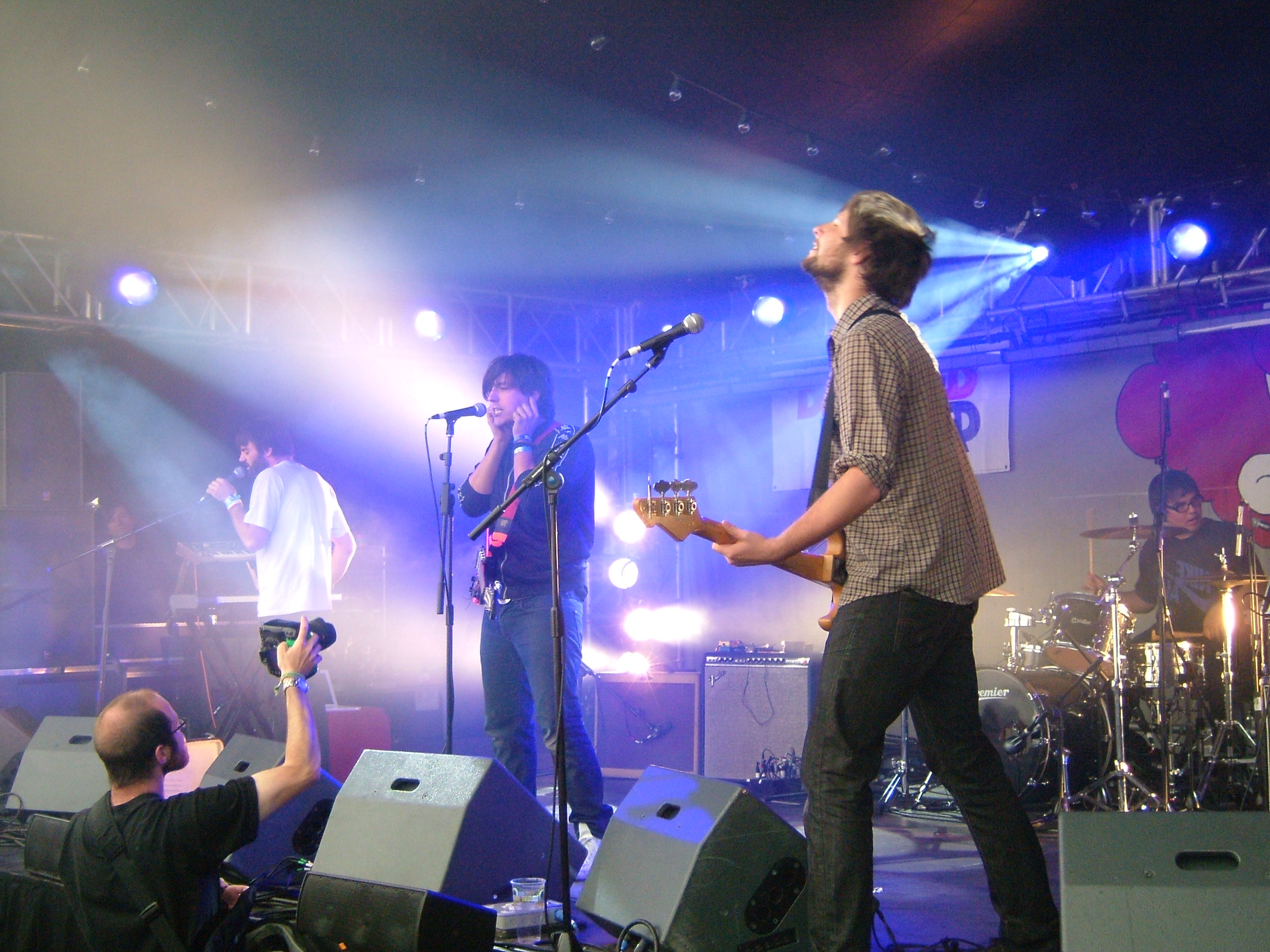
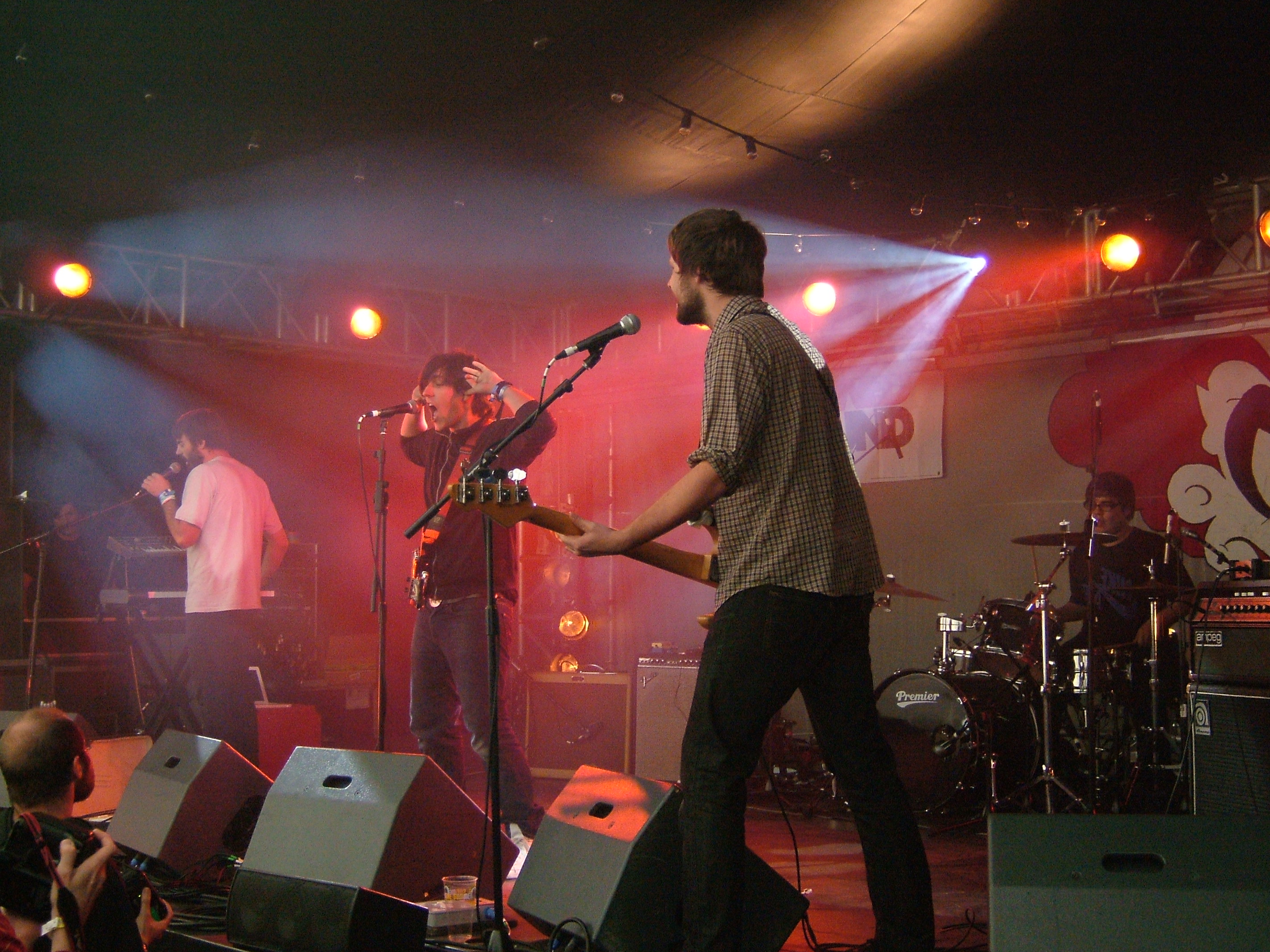
The Mae Shi performing at Summer Sundae in Leicester, England (August 2008)

The Mae Shi explained the group's inspiration to write the song in a statement. The group felt Bale's outburst was irrational and was motivated to write a piece about it. The Mae Shi emphasized in their statement that this was not a traditional song associated with their group's normal work, but rather a homage to Bale.

The Mae Shi drummer Brad Breeck commented in an interview that the band decided to make a song about the incident late in the evening of February 2, 2009. Breeck noted that they listened to the audio of the Bale diatribe and put together their tribute piece within a span of two hours before putting it online. Jacob Cooper, another drummer in the band, commented to The Arizona Daily Star that he was surprised how popular their piece became when they had devoted relatively little time to composing and recording it.

The lyrics of the song include references to films Bale appeared in including Newsies, Swing Kids, American Psycho, and The Dark Knight. The song begins with the phrase, "He is the Dark Knight, he is professional." The piece incorporates audio clips from the incident through the use of sampling. The chorus of the song references Bale's use of the word professional in his altercation: "Oh, whoo wow / He is professional / But I think he's lost control". Lyrics include: "Swing Kid with a violent streak", "Step back, stay out of his light / Better not try to put up a fight / Newsies will get you tonight / 'Cause they're professional!", and "Don't look too deep in his eyes/he can't hide what's inside of his mind/and it might get a little bit ugly/and you might meet an American Psycho".

== Release and reception ==
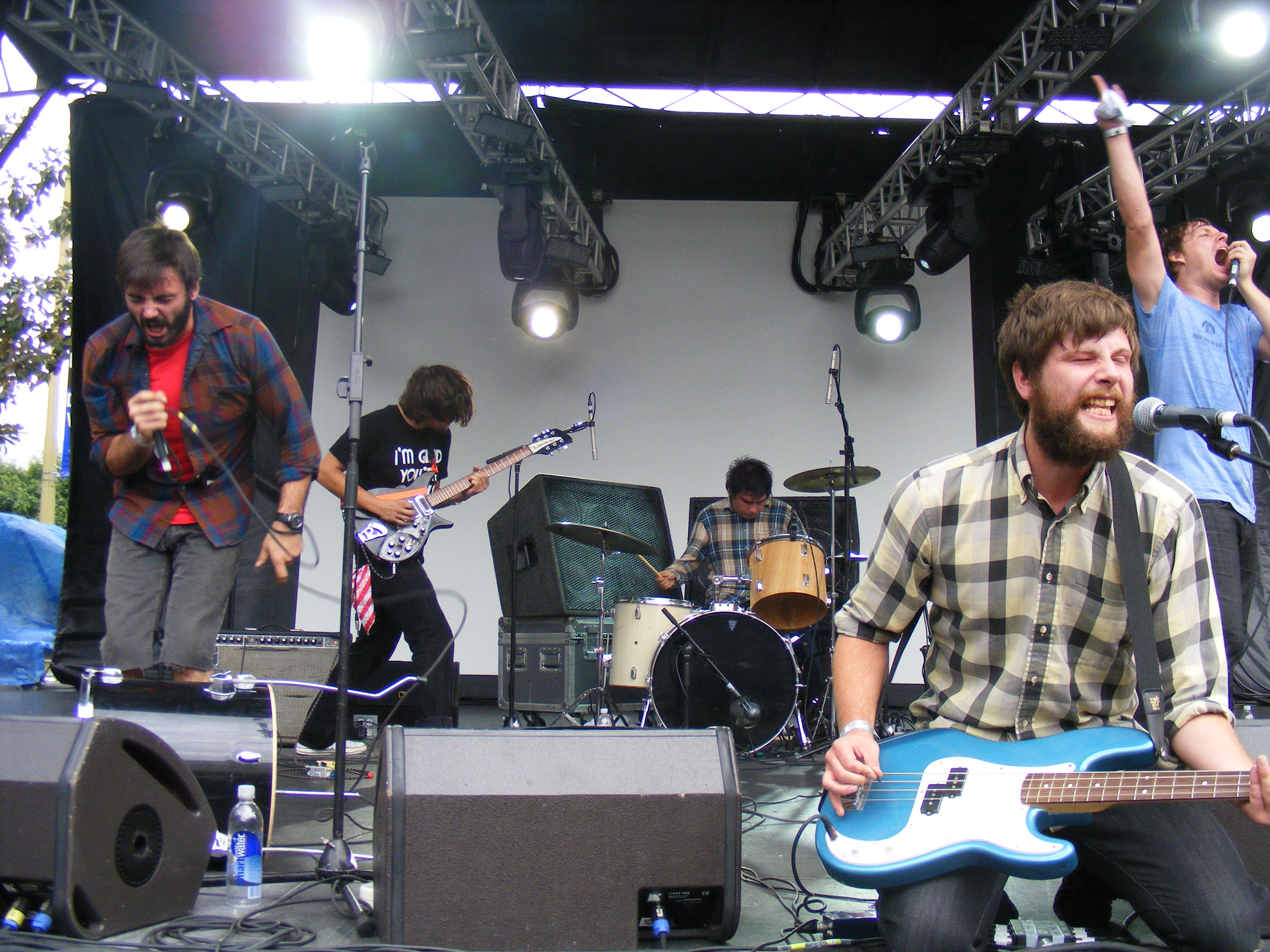
The Mae Shi performing at LA Weekly Detour Music Festival in Los Angeles (October 2008)

"R U Professional" was made available on YouTube and MediaFire on February 3, 2009. The video description on YouTube by the group stated, "Song By The Mae Shi celebrating the life and work of Xtian Bale. Bale's performance as John Connor in the upcoming Terminator 4 'Redemption' Film will no doubt be one of the greatest of all time. He will win every Oscar for his performance, even the special effects and animation ones." The Independent reported that the band would appear at a music festival, "The Fans Strike Back", and requested they perform "R U Professional".

Several media outlets attempted to place the work within a particular genre. MTV compared the song's style to the group Devo and new wave music. El País described the piece as an electropop song that contributed to the viral spread of the Christian Bale rant after its release on the Internet. Dose described it as an electro jam session which made adept use of sampling from the audio of Bale's rhetoric. The Los Angeles Times called the piece a lively pop music tribute to the actor. USA Today called the song fun dance music and creatively motivated. The Toronto Sun praised its original lyrics and use of audio from the incident, and described the piece as a fusion of electro-pop styles and a good song for dancing. New Musical Express recommended the piece, and described it as electro-rock which astutely sampled Bale throughout the song. The St. Louis Post-Dispatch described the piece as a form of new wave music which used the most spasmodic segments of the incident, and commented that the end product was comedic. The Arizona Daily Star described the piece as a pop music dance song.

Multiple sources remarked upon the speed with which The Mae Shi were able to put the song together and release it. The A.V. Club highlighted the song among Internet memes inspired by the Bale melee, and wrote that though the piece was put together quickly it was quite entertaining and inventive. The Irish Independent was surprised at the speed multiple different satirical adaptations of the Bale commotion audio including "R U Professional" were put together. The newspaper questioned whether the song was composed in one day, and speculated that the melody might have been written by the group previously and modified to use with audio from the Bale incident. Pitchfork Media was impressed that "R U Professional" was made in twenty-four hours.

Various websites commented that the song was a unique way to pay tribute to Christian Bale and his body of work. Boing Boing called the song an amusing homage to Bale. C7nema commented that the song was hilarious and dedicated to Bale's odd behavior. The Celebrity Cafe wrote that the piece was better than "Bale Out" by RevoLucian which also dealt with the incident. Chicagoist wrote that the song by The Mae Shi was their favorite of the Christian Bale remixes. Chico News & Review called the piece a caring accolade to Bale's on-set tirade.

== See also ==
- List of Internet phenomena
- "Ocean's Three and a Half", an episode of Family Guy which also dealt with the story
