= Banana Dance =

Banana Dance may refer to:

- Dancing Banana is a popular emoticon
- Danse des bananes, an exotic dance performed by Josephine Baker
- "Dr. Jean's Banana Dance", a song and video by American children's author and musician Dr. Jean
- A skit performed by American comedian Chris Elliott
- "The Banana Dance", an episode of Australian television series Bananas in Pyjamas
