= Heartbeeps (album) =

Studio album by The Mae Shi
- Released: June 7, 2005
- Genre: Experimental, punk rock
- Label: 5 Rue Christine, Kill Rock Stars

The Mae Shi chronology
Terrorbird (2004)	Heartbeeps (2005)	HLLLYH (2006)

Professional ratings
Review scores
Source	Rating
AllMusic	3.5/5 stars
Pitchfork	7.0/10

Heartbeeps is the third album by Los Angeles–based experimental punk band The Mae Shi. It was released on June 7, 2005. Notable influences on the musical style of the record include Melt-Banana, Deerhoof and UK grime, as well as their adolescent love of Def Leppard, Nine Inch Nails, Dante’s Inferno and worship music. As with Terrorbird, they recorded it themselves in their bedrooms and living rooms, making up recording techniques as they went along. Lyrics to the album are pulled from neuroscience textbooks and Plato’s Republic.

== Track listing ==
1. "Heartbeeps" – 0:10
2. "Born for a Short Time" – 1:04
3. "Crimes Of Infancy" – 01:44
4. "Heartbeeps" – 00:17
5. "The Meat Of The Inquiry" – 01:40
6. "Spoils Of Injury" – 00:42
7. "Eat The Prize" – 03:16
8. "Spoils Of Victory" – 02:02
9. "The Universal Polymath" – 02:22
10. "Heartbeeps" – 02:20
