= Ice cream cake (disambiguation) =

Ice cream cake is a cake made with ice cream.

Ice cream cake may also refer to:

- Ice Cream Cake (EP), debut EP by South Korean band Red Velvet
- Ice Cream Cake (song), a song by South Korean band Red Velvet
- Ice Cream and Cake, a song by the Buckwheat Boyz
