= Manike =

Manike may refer to:

- Manike Attanayake (born 1947), Sri Lankan actress
- Manike Mage Hithe, song
