= Supermax (disambiguation) =

Supermax is a type of high-security prison or prison unit.

Supermax or Super Max may also refer to:

- Supermax (band), a band
- Supermax (Malaysia), a Malaysian company
- Supermax (TV channel), a Czech former TV channel
- Supermax (Brazilian TV series), a Brazilian television series
- Supermax (Spanish TV series), a Spanish reality television series
- Super Max, a Russian television series that’s a shot for shot remake of Malcolm in the Middle
- ADX Florence or Supermax, a specific prison facility in Fremont County, Colorado, U.S.
- Supermax contract, the popular name of a contract that can be offered to certain elite NBA players
- Super Max, nickname of Formula One driver Max Verstappen
- "Super Max!", a song by Dutch music group the Pitstop Boys
- Supermax (film), an American action crime thriller

== See also ==
- Maximum Security (disambiguation)
- Super Max, a planned Green Arrow superhero film
