= Thank God (film) =

2022 Indian film by Indra Kumar

- Theatrical release poster
- Directed by: Indra Kumar
- Written by: Aakash Kaushik; Madhur Sharma
- Based on: Sorte kugler by Anders Matthesen
- Produced by: Bhushan Kumar; Krishan Kumar; Ashok Thakeria; Sunir Kheterpal; Deepak Mukut; Anand Pandit; Markand Adhikari
- Starring: Sidharth Malhotra; Ajay Devgn; Rakul Preet Singh
- Cinematography: Aseem Bajaj
- Edited by: Dharmendra Sharma
- Music by: Score: Amar Mohile; Songs: Tanishk Bagchi; Rochak Kohli; Chamath Sangeeth
- Production companies: T-Series Films; Maruti International; Soham Rockstar; Anand Pandit Motion Pictures
- Distributed by: AA Films
- Release date: 25 October 2022
- Running time: 121 minutes
- Country: India
- Language: Hindi
- Budget: ₹100 crore
- Box office: est. ₹48.92 crore

Thank God is a 2022 Indian Hindi-language fantasy comedy-drama film directed by Indra Kumar. A remake of the 2009 Danish film Sorte kugler, it stars Sidharth Malhotra, Ajay Devgn and Rakul Preet Singh.

Thank God was released theatrically on 25 October 2022, on Diwali festivities. It received mixed reviews from critics and was a commercial failure.

== Plot ==
Ayaan Kapoor is an extremely greedy, selfish and egoistic real estate businessman who is in a debt of ₹16 crores. His day-to-day life involves carrying out his real estate business in 80% black and 20% white money, visiting a nearby Hanuman temple every Tuesday and Saturday to smear the idol of Hanuman with holy paste, offer laddus, pour oil on the idol and greedily ask for petty things. He has a booming real estate business, but falls into debt due to the demonetisation. He wants to sell his mansion to clear his debts but can't find any buyer and starts living at his wife's house with his wife, Inspector Ruhi, and daughter Pihu.

One day, Ayaan gets involved in a road accident, and regains consciousness in Heaven, where Yamaduta and Chitragupta alias "CG" give him a chance to go back to Earth, by asking him to play a game called Game of Life. He is shown a vision of his physical body currently being in the operation theatre, during which his soul will play the game.

The rules of the game: There are two containers - one for white balls, which represent Ayaan's positives, and the other for black balls, which represent his sins and weaknesses. The containers would be filled with white or black balls by the residents of heaven, which will be considered their votes. The votes would be given based on how Ayaan does his virtual tasks and how he behaves in a certain situations. If the container with the black balls overflows, he will be sent to hell and if the container with the white balls overflows, he gets to return to Earth.

CG starts to show Ayaan his sins one after the other. When he's shown his sin “jealousy”, Ayaan argues with CG that he finds it unfair that his wife became a police officer when she is actually incapable of it. So CG recreates a situation virtually in which Ayaan is put in the same place as his wife was, in real life - a bank hostage situation. Ayaan fails to be a good police officer in the virtual situation, and argues that anyone in his place would have failed. Then, CG plays the real footage of how Ruhi handled the situation with her intelligence, bravery and empathy. Ayaan is stunned. Similarly, one after the other, Ayaan is shown all the times his weaknesses got the better of him and when he tries to reason with CG, he is put in that situation virtually and shown what he did wrong.

The black balls keep on getting accumulated but in a situation where Ayaan takes the help of a lifeline (CG's help) and shows love to his mom instead of belittling her, he starts to get white balls. He is then tasked to tell his sister the truth about their childhood home burning down. In their childhood, during Diwali, one of Ayaan's rockets misfires and ends up burning their house but when his parents ask him how the fire started, he panics and puts the blame on his sister. His sister ends up believing it's her fault.

In heaven, Ayaan meets and gets beaten up by his father due to which he is sent to the earth briefly to apologise to his sister. He finally tells her the truth. The white ball container overflows and CG declares Ayaan as a winner.

CG then asks Ayaan if he would like to donate some white balls to the next contestant. Ayaan's selfishness shows up again and he says “no,” because he doesn't care who the next contestant is, he just wants to leave.

However, CG sees the phone number of Ayaan's favourite actress on Ayaan's hand, and declares that Ayaan has cheated, thus Ayaan gets many black balls. Additionally, CG reveals to Ayaan that the car which collided with Ayaan's car was being driven by his wife and now, Ruhi and Pihu are battling for their lives in the hospital. He tells Ayaan that they are the next contestants on the Game of Life. CG then shows him the footage, where his wife and relatives pool money to buy him a new car after hearing that his current car would be towed due to his bank loan. Ayaan is horrified and very angry at himself for being so selfish. Suddenly, the white balls get replaced by black balls and black balls overflow from both the containers. Ayaan has to die and go to hell. But CG changes his mind - he sends Ayaan back to Earth to make him experience hell on earth, which is, living without his family.

Ayaan returns to Earth. The doctor tells him that Pihu and Ruhi are in a coma and that both have kidney damage. He begs the doctor to take his kidneys. But the doctor refuses, saying that's not possible. He is asked by the doctor to choose between his wife and daughter. Ayaan is devastated and commits suicide (by consuming his pain killer) so that both of his kidneys can be taken for Ruhi and Pihu. Before killing himself, he signs the donor form and leaves an emotional message to the doctor saying he wants his family to live and he doesn't care about himself.

This time, Ayaan returns to heaven as a hero. CG, Ayaan's father and all the other residents of heaven are proud of him. CG blesses Ayaan and his family with a new life. So Ayaan returns to earth again. The doctors give Ayaan news that Ruhi and Pihu have undergone successful kidney transplants because of a man who brought in his dead relative's body. Ayaan wants to thank the man for saving his family's life, but the doctors say they know nothing about the man except that he wore a locket around his neck with the letters "CG". Ayaan cries happy tears.

Having been given a second chance at life, Ayaan vows to accumulate only “punya” now and be a loving, supportive and responsible family man. Ayaan gets his ancestral home repaired and hands over the keys to his sister and her husband. He also adopts the grandson of the hungry old woman who died due to Ayaan's refusal to help her. He is shown celebrating his wife and loving his family like never before.

== Cast ==
- Sidharth Malhotra as Ayaan Kapoor
- Ajay Devgn as C. G. (Chitragupta)
- Rakul Preet Singh as Inspector Ruhi Kapoor, Ayaan's wife
- Kiara Khanna as Pihu Kapoor, Ayaan's daughter
- Seema Pahwa as Mrs. Kapoor, Ayaan's mother
- Kanwaljit Singh as Professor Avinash Kapoor, Ayaan's father
- Urmilla Kothare as Ayaan's sister
- Pratik Dixit as Ayaan's brother-in-law
- Kiku Sharda as Fatso in Lift
- Sumit Gulati as Ayaan's Mansion Client
- Vikram Kochhar as Inspector Tambe
- Mahesh Balraj as YD (Yamdoot)
- Saanand Verma as Dr. Akshat "Akki" Gupta
- Soundarya Sharma as Tanya (cameo)
- Nora Fatehi as Herself (special appearance in the song "Manike")

== Production ==
The official announcement of the film was made on 7 January 2021. Principal photography began in Mumbai on 21 January, and wrapped on 11 January 2022.

== Soundtrack ==
Thank God

Soundtrack album by Tanishk Bagchi, Rochak Kohli and Chamath Sangeeth
- Released: 22 October 2022
- Recorded: 2021–2022
- Studio: T-Series Studios, Sound of Bombay
- Genre: Feature film soundtrack
- Length: 15:34
- Language: Hindi
- Label: T-Series
- Producer: Bhushan Kumar

Official audio
- Thank God - Full Album on YouTube

The songs are composed by Tanishk Bagchi, Rochak Kohli and Chamath Sangeeth. The lyrics are written by Manoj Muntashir, Rashmi Virag, Sameer, Dulan ARX and Mellow D. The film score is composed by Amar Mohile.

The first song "Manike" is a remake of "Manike Mage Hithe", sung by the same singer Yohani.

Track listing
No.	Title	Lyrics	Music	Singer(s)	Length
1.	"Manike"	Rashmi Virag, Dulan ARX, Mellow D	Tanishk Bagchi, Chamath Sangeeth	Yohani, Jubin Nautiyal, Surya Ragunnathan	3:17
2.	"Haaniya Ve"	Rashmi Virag	Tanishk Bagchi	Jubin Nautiyal	3:37
3.	"Dil De Diya"	Rashmi Virag	Rochak Kohli	Anand Raaj Anand	4:34
4.	"Thank God - Title Track"	Manoj Muntashir	Rochak Kohli	Arijit Singh, Eklavya	4:06
Total length:					15:34

== Reception ==
Thank God received mixed reviews from critics and audiences. Critics praised the lead actors' performances and the humor, but criticised the premise and the script.

On the review aggregator website Rotten Tomatoes, 29% of 7 critics' reviews are positive, with an average rating of 4.7/10.

Bollywood Hungama rated the film 3.5 out of 5 stars and wrote "Thank God is a film that entertains and enlightens, a perfect family entertainer this Diwali". Ganesh Aaglave of Firstpost rated the film 3.5 out of 5 stars and wrote "Director Indra Kumar perfectly blends comedy and drama to give us a Diwali entertainer with Ajay Devgn, Sidharth Malhotra and Rakul Preet Singh starrer Thank God". Dhaval Roy of The Times of India rated the film 3 out of 5 stars and wrote "The film has a message or two about moving on about tribulations, being humane and the importance of one's family". Devesh Sharma of Filmfare rated the film 3 out of 5 stars and wrote "Watch Thank God for its light-hearted moments". Rohit Bhatnagar of The Free Press Journal rated the film 3 out of 5 stars and wrote "Thank God is a so-called family entertainer that is stuck in the '90s. Watch it if you are okay to expect a sob tale rather than a pure comedy". Sonil Dedhia of News 18 rated the film 3 out of 5 stars and wrote "Thank God is an entertainer with its share of funny moments". Pratikshya Mishra of The Quint rated the film 2.5 out of 5 stars and wrote "The film goes from comedy to grief to introspection rapidly. While all these emotions are deployed well individually, as a whole, the film suffers from this constant tonal shift". Tushar Joshi of India Today rated the film 2 out of 5 stars and wrote "Despite Ajay's star power and Siddharth's charm, the film fails to hold the viewers' interest".
