= Bale Out =

2009 song by Lucian Piane

Song by Lucian Piane
- Language: English
- Published: YouTube
- Released: February 2, 2009
- Recorded: Los Angeles, California
- Genre: Dance
- Length: 2:46; 7:06 (extended)
- Songwriter: Lucian Piane
- Producer: Lucian Piane

"Bale Out: RevoLucian's Christian Bale Remix!" is a satirical dance remix by American composer Lucian Piane, also known as RevoLucian, released on February 2, 2009, to YouTube and Myspace. The piece parodies Christian Bale by utilizing audio from a July 2008 rant made by the actor on the set of Terminator Salvation. Various other elements are used in the remix, including pulsating dance track beats and clips of Barbra Streisand from a 2006 exchange with a supporter of then-President George W. Bush, creating the impression of Streisand arguing with Bale.

The day after its release, the YouTube page for the song had been viewed over 200,000 times, and over a million times by February 5, 2009. The Associated Press called it a "hypnotic dance track", and United Press International noted it was "catchy", characterizing it as a "YouTube sensation". Gil Kaufman of MTV.com described the piece as "a techno-ripping, demonic dance party". Time magazine's website called the track "hilarious", and Nine News characterized it as a "raging online success". The director of Terminator Salvation McG liked the remix and put a copy of it on his iPod, and Bale said he had heard the remix and thought "they did a good job".

== Background ==
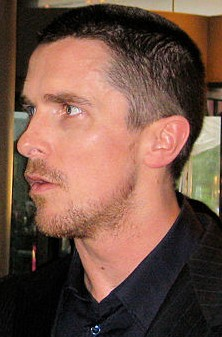
Christian Bale in July 2008, the same month as his outburst

In July 2008, Christian Bale was filming an intense scene in New Mexico for the film Terminator Salvation with actress Bryce Dallas Howard. The film's director of photography, Shane Hurlbut, walked into Bale's eyeline, and the actor proceeded to humiliate Hurlbut by lecturing him. Bale said he would leave the film if Hurlbut repeated the error and was not subsequently fired. Hurlbut responded calmly and apologized several times to Bale, and continued shooting for seven hours after the incident.

The website TMZ.com reported the occurrence soon after it happened, and posted an audio recording on February 2, 2009. The event did not become widely publicized until after TMZ.com had posted the audio of Bale's outburst. TMZ.com reported that film executives for Terminator Salvation sent a copy of the audio recording to the film's insurance company, in case Bale refused to continue filming.

Four days after the audio recording was posted to the Internet, Bale appeared as a guest on Los Angeles radio station KROQ-FM, where he discussed the controversy. He said he "acted like a punk", and that he and Hurlbut talked after the argument and "resolved this completely". Bale acknowledged the two worked together for several hours after the episode, and "at least a month after that", and noted, "I've seen a rough cut of the movie and he has done a wonderful job. It looks fantastic."

== Composition ==
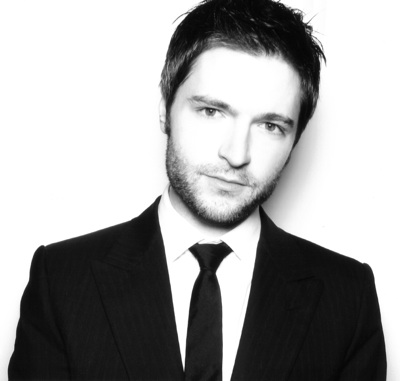
Lucian Piane (2009)

Prior to the release of "Bale Out", Lucian Piane was known for a variety of satirical remixes, including tracks featuring Alaska Governor Sarah Palin, political commentator Bill O'Reilly during an on-camera outburst in the 1980s, and Andrew Meyer, who received national media attention when he was tasered by police during a speech given by U.S. Senator John Kerry at the University of Florida.

The Associated Press reported that Piane was "drawn to the musicality of Bale's rage-filled voice". Piane spent three hours working on the remix. "When I heard Christian Bale flip out I had to remix the track. ... It's good to hear that clubs have already started playing it as it is very funny", said Piane. In an interview with LA Weekly, Piane commented that he wants his remix remembered, instead of Bale's outburst: "We're all people in this world. So I figured, [instead of] remembering that one time Christian Bale went crazy on set, maybe people will remember the remix."

The "Bale Out" mashup incorporates audio clips of Bale lashing out, and Hurlbut responding "I was looking at the lights." The chorus includes a clip of Bale saying "it's fucking distracting", and "What don't you fuckin' understand?" The sound collage includes clips of Barbra Streisand from a 2006 exchange with a supporter of former-President George W. Bush, making it sound as though Streisand is arguing with Bale. Piane told the Associated Press: "I don't know if Christian Bale is enjoying it, but I hope he does. I think I've taken something that maybe made him look really bad and turned it into something that all these people are enjoying."

== Release ==
Piane uploaded the piece to MySpace and YouTube on February 2, 2009, hours after the original clip of Bale appeared on the internet. Piane made an MP3 file of "Bale Out" available as a free download from his MySpace page. "Bale Out" had been viewed over 200,000 times one day after it was uploaded to YouTube, and within two days it had received 700,000 hits. Three days after its posting, "Bale Out" had been viewed over one million times on YouTube, and over 1.5 million times after one week.

In a report on the remix for The Situation Room on CNN, correspondent Brooke Anderson noted "by the looks of this musical parody already posted on YouTube, this infamous rant will be talked about – for a long time to come." Anderson Cooper of Anderson Cooper 360° described the RevoLucian remix as "the ballistic Bale boogie". A piece in Vue Weekly posed the question "what does it all mean in the end when a remixed diatribe by a Hollywood star will get way more hits in a day than any film-criticism site in a year?"

== Reception ==
LA Weekly reported that McG, the director of Terminator Salvation, had a copy of "Bale Out" on his iPod. "And I have to admit, that dance remix [on YouTube] is pretty hot", said McG in an interview with Fast Company. In an interview with E!: Entertainment Television to discuss Terminator: Salvation, Christian Bale said he had heard the remix and commented: "It was a good remix; they did a good job." Bale said he had received a remix of his outburst from a friend: "They did a bloody good job! I've gotta say, what a great impulse, you know? To take something ugly like that and make it into a dance? That's a wonderful thing."

The Associated Press described the piece as a "hypnotic dance track", "beat-driven", and a "pulsating tune". The AP noted "Bale has become an unwitting music sensation because of the incident." A Los Angeles Times blog described "Bale Out" as "a genius piece of mixing by L.A.'s very own RevoLucian", and called the piece a "brilliant" club remix. MTV.com called it "a techno-ripping, demonic dance party in which Bale's berating is repeated ad nauseam under pictures of the actor and random f-bomb interjections from Barbra Streisand". United Press International characterized the remix as a "YouTube sensation", calling it "catchy".

LA Weekly described the remix as "a mash-up of Bale's best quotes set to a synth-heavy beat", and noted "'Bale Out' turned 'What don't you fuckin' understand?' into one of the year's most addictive choruses and spun a little art out of the debacle." The Irish Independent called the piece a "painstakingly constructed dance track", and described the chorus as "oddly catchy". The Globe and Mail commented that the remix has "an imperilling beat, a genius comedic flair and more sheer scariness than American Psycho and Terminator combined". The Wall Street Journal wrote that Piane combined Bale's language with "a driving house music track".

Time magazine's website described the piece as "a hilarious YouTube musical remix". Nine News called RevoLucian's piece a "cheeky remix" and a "raging online success". The Daily Telegraph in London highlighted the RevoLucian piece among the "Best of the mash-ups and spoofs" of the Bale outburst, noting he arranged the audio clips from Bale into a "potential dancefloor success". Dose magazine commented "We've been throwing light-switch raves to the RevoLucian mix all week", and BlackBook magazine described it as "a brilliant club mix of Bale's meltdown that's bound to scream in your head all day". The A.V. Club called the piece "a Hater-worthy techno remix", and The Celebrity Cafe commented "Revolucian's remix must have had techno artists everywhere sweating to come up with something half as good, and likely inspired a few outlandish requests by club goers."

North Carolina State University doctoral student Matt Morain commented on the remixes spawned by Bale's rant, in an April 2009 paper on Internet memes. Morain noted that remixes of Bale's rant received more hits than the rant itself, "What is more surprising than the nearly two million views is that a number of remixes appeared, in response to the clip, which have substantially higher view-counts than the original. In this process of remixing we can clearly see the elements of fantasy theme and rhetorical transmission." Perez Hilton commented, "Once again, Lucian Piane has outdone himself! You must listen to this." Hilton posted a video to his blog of himself dancing to Piane's remix.

On November 17, 2009, Piane's remix received a nomination for "Best Remix of the Year" by the website Urlesque. The website's staff noted the Piane remix "spread like wildfire", and became an Internet phenomenon. Piane's remix was one of five nominations; it lost to the "Slap Chop Rap" parodying Vince Offer. "Bale Out" was a finalist in the category of "Latest Favorite Viral Video", in the "2009 Best of Clicker Awards"; the winner was "David After Dentist". "Bale Out" was nominated for a Webby Award in 2010, in the category of "Best Video Remixes/Mashups". The 2010 winner in the category for the Webby was "Auto-Tune the News".

== Awards and nominations ==
Year	Award	Organization	Category	Result
2009	Best of the Web – The Urlies	Urlesque	Best Remix of the Year	Nominated
2009	Best of Clicker Awards	Clicker.com	Latest Favorite Viral Video	Finalist
2010	Webby Award	International Academy of Digital Arts and Sciences	Best Video Remixes/Mashups	Nominated

== See also ==
- List of Internet phenomena
- List of YouTube celebrities
- "Ocean's Three and a Half"
- Parody music
- "R U Professional"
