= Maximum security prison =

Maximum security prisons and supermax prisons are grades of high security level used by prison systems in various countries, which pose a higher level of security to prevent prisoners from escaping and/or doing harm to other inmates or security guards.

- For the United States, see Incarceration in the United States § Security levels
- For Canada, see Correctional Service of Canada § Security classification of offenders
- For other prison systems, see Prison § Security levels

== See also ==
- Maximum Security (disambiguation)
