= Prasanna De Silva =

Sri Lankan general

Prasanna de Silva WWV, RWP, RSP
- ප්‍රසන්න ද සිල්වා
- Born: 5 May 1961 (age 65)
- Children: Yohani Diloka de Silva; Shavindri de Silva
- Military career
- Allegiance: Sri Lanka
- Branch: Sri Lanka Army
- Service years: 1982 - 2016
- Rank: Major General
- Units: Sri Lanka Light Infantry; Sri Lanka Army Special Forces Regiment
- Commands: General Officer Commanding, 56 Division; Commander of Special Forces Brigade
- Conflicts: Eelam War I, Eelam War II, Eelam War III, Eelam War IV, Sri Lankan Civil War
- Awards: Weera Wickrama Vibhushanaya; Rana Wickrama Padakkama; Rana Sura Padakkama

Major General Prasanna de Silva, WWV, RWP, RSP is a retired Sri Lankan general officer, who served as the General Officer Commanding, 56 Division, Commander of Special Forces Brigade and Colonel of the Regiment of the Commando Regiment. He was later appointed defence attaché to the Sri Lankan High Commission in London (2010–2012). De Silva has been accused by multiple international human rights organizations of alleged war crimes and crimes against humanity during the final stages of the Sri Lankan Civil War, including the deliberate targeting of civilians, attacks on hospitals and other designated “No Fire Zones”, and the use of internationally banned weapons. Diplomatic immunity prevented his prosecution while in the UK, and he returned to Sri Lanka amid calls for criminal investigation over these allegations.

== Education ==
De Silva was educated at Ananda College in Colombo.

== Military career ==
He joined the Sri Lanka Army in 1982, during the early phase of Eelam War I.

Brigadier Silva’s little-known exploits included the coordination of the Long Range Reconnaissance Patrol, which carried out most complex and dangerous military operations when he was a Lieutenant Colonel.

Silva was the ground commander for the Mavil Aru, Sampoor, Manirasakulam and then the famous Vakarai Operations.

He became a major threat to the Liberation Tigers of Tamil Eelam (LTTE) during the Sri Lankan Civil War because he was in command of the Army’s elite Brigade Special Forces, who were successful in assassinating several high-level commanders of the LTTE in LTTE-held territory.

The 55 Division under the command of Brigadier Prasanna De Silva marched more than 100 km, linking up with the Wanni front at Elephant Pass to reopen the A-9 road and clear the Sea Tigers bases covering the Eastern Coastal line from Nagar Kovil to Mullaitivu.

After the war, de Silva served as defence attaché to the Sri Lankan Embassy in London, UK. In 2012, the Global Tank Forum took legal action and presented a dossier on de Silva to the British Foreign and Commonwealth Office (FCO), including accusations of war crimes. However, he completed the routine transfer back to Sri Lanka.

== Family ==
He is married to Dinithi De Silva, who is a former air hostess at SriLankan Airlines, and they have two daughters, Yohani De Silva and Shavindri De Silva.

== Awards and decorations ==

| Weera Wickrama Vibhushanaya | Rana Wickrama Padakkama | | Rana Sura Padakkama |
| Desha Putra Sammanaya | Purna Bhumi Padakkama | North and East Operations Medal | Vadamarachchi Operation Medal |
| Riviresa Campaign Services Medal | 50th Independence Anniversary Commemoration Medal | Sri Lanka Army 50th Anniversary Medal | Sri Lanka Armed Services Long Service Medal |
