= Maximum Security =

Maximum Security may refer to:

- Supermax, "control-unit" prisons, or units within prisons
- Maximum Security (comics), a comic book miniseries published by Marvel Comics
- Maximum Security (Tony MacAlpine album), 1987
- Maximum Security (Alien Sex Fiend album), 1985
- Maximum Security (TV series), an American drama television series on HBO
- "Maximum Security" (Brooklyn Nine-Nine), a television episode
- Maximum Security (novel), the third book of the CHERUB series
- Maximum Security (horse) (foaled 2016), American racehorse
- Prison Tycoon 2: Maximum Security, a 2006 computer game

== See also ==
- Supermax (disambiguation)
- Maximum security prison
