= HLLLYH =

Studio album by The Mae Shi
- Released: February 11, 2008
- Genre: Experimental, punk
- Label: Team Shi, Moshi Moshi Records

The Mae Shi chronology
Heartbeeps (2005)	HLLLYH (2008)

Professional ratings
Review scores
Source	Rating
Pitchfork Media	8.1/10 link
Time Out London	link
Twisted Ear	link
Yahoo! Music	link

HLLLYH (either Halleluyah or Hell Yeah) is the fourth and final studio album by Los Angeles–based experimental punk band The Mae Shi. It was released on February 11, 2008. It is a concept album about Judeo-Christian religion, featuring mediations on stories of the Old Testament.

== Track listing ==
1. "Lamb and the Lion" – 2:24
2. "PWND" – 2:48
3. "Boys in the Attic" – 1:24
4. "7 x x 7" – 2:02
5. "The Melody" – 2:18
6. "Leech and Locust" – 2:45
7. "Run to Your Grave" – 3:53
8. "Kingdom Come" – 11:37
9. "I Get (Almost) Everything I Want" – 3:43
10. "Party Politics" – 2:14
11. "Young Marks" – 2:05
12. "Book of Numbers" – 1:55
13. "HLLLYH" – 4:56
14. "Divine Harvest" – 2:14

== Critical reception ==
HLLLYH received positive reviews, garnering a rating of 8.1 from independent music reviewer Pitchfork Media. Pitchfork also endorsed the album with an official recommendation and put it No. 18 on their staff list for the year.
