= Terrorbird =

Studio album by The Mae Shi
- Released: July 2004
- Recorded: 2003–2004
- Genres: Art punk, post-hardcore, sasscore
- Labels: 5 Rue Christine, Kill Rock Stars, S.A.F. Records

The Mae Shi chronology
Terrorbird (2004)	Heartbeeps (2005)

Professional ratings
Aggregate scores
Source	Rating
Metacritic	70/100
Review scores
Source	Rating
Allmusic	4/5 stars
Pitchfork Media	6.5/10

Terrorbird is the debut album release by Los Angeles–based experimental punk band The Mae Shi. It was released in July 2004 on CD by 5 Rue Christine and on vinyl by Strictly Amateur Films. The original pressing of the record was limited to 500 copies.

== Track listing ==
1. Terror Bird
2. Power to the Power. Bite 2
3. Revelation Two
4. Revelation Three
5. Jubilee
6. Untitled
7. Hieronymus Bosch Is a Dead Man
8. Chop 2
9. Takoma the Dolphin Is AWOL
10. Vampire Beats
11. Surf's Up
12. Bite 1. Bite 3
13. Testify
14. Terror Bird
15. Revelation Six
16. One Mississippi, Two Mississippi, Three Mississippi
17. Vampire Zoo
18. Body 1. Bite 1
19. Body 2
20. Do This
21. Hard Luck Built New England
22. Megamouth
23. Revelation Four
24. V. Beats
25. Bite 4
26. Chop 1
27. Virgin's Diet, the Hand of Wolves
28. Jubilation
29. Repetition
30. Repetition
31. Repetition
32. Repetition
33. Repetition
