= Do Not Ignore the Potential =

Studio album by The Mae Shi and Rapider Than Horsepower
- Released: 2006
- Genres: Experimental, Punk
- Label: S.A.F. Records

Do Not Ignore the Potential is a split LP release by Los Angeles–based experimental punk band The Mae Shi and Indiana-based indie rock band Rapider Than Horsepower.

== Track listing ==
=== The Mae Shi ===
1. The Potential
2. Don't Ignore the Potential
3. Remarkably Dirty Animals
4. Heartbeeps
5. Massively Overwrought
6. Nickel Arcade
7. The Bear

=== Rapider Than Horsepower ===
1. Split LP with Mae Shi
2. The Real Party
3. Look At Me
4. Testify
5. OOOOOOOHHHHHHH
6. Something Dirty
7. HA-CHEW
8. $15.99
9. Radio Activity
10. Slow Motion and Descent
11. N/A
12. C'mon Give Me the Feeling
