= Yohani =

Sri Lankan singer (born 1993)

- Born: Yohani Diloka de Silva; 30 July 1993 (age 33); Colombo, Sri Lanka
- Education: Central Queensland University
- Occupations: Singer; songwriter; model
- Years active: 2016–present
- Father: Prasanna de Silva

Yohani Diloka de Silva (born 30 July 1993), known mononymously as Yohani, is a Sri Lankan singer-songwriter, rapper, and YouTuber. She started her music career as a YouTuber. She soon gained recognition for her cover of 'Manike Mage Hithe' and released many covers of her singing and rapping which have earned her the title "Rap Princess" of Sri Lanka. She rose to prominence and gained global recognition for her cover of "Manike Mage Hithe". She also became the first Sri Lankan female singer to surpass a total of 3.60 million subscribers on YouTube.

== Personal life ==
Yohani was born on 30 July 1993 in Colombo, Sri Lanka. She is the daughter of a former Army officer Major General Prasanna de Silva. Her mother Dinithi de Silva, was a former cabin crew member at SriLankan Airlines. She is a Buddhist and has practiced Buddhism since her early life. Yohani has one younger sister, Shavindri de Silva, who is currently studying medicine. Due to their father's military background, both girls grew up in different Army bases in Sri Lanka.

Yohani's interest and practice in music began early in her life, and it was her mother who identified her keenness and prompted her to pursue this passion at a young age. She grew up surrounded by her parents' love of music as they often listened to the BeeGees, Spice Girls, AR Rahman and Elton John. She was schooled in Visakha Vidyalaya Colombo. She completed her higher education in Logistics Management and Professional Accounting from the General Sir John Kotelawala Defence University prior to pursuing her career as an artist. She also obtained a master's degree in accounting from CQUniversity Australia.

== Career ==
Yohani's music career took centre stage upon her return to Sri Lanka in March 2019. She joined Pettah Effect, a record label that was co-founded by Dilanjan, and had much young talent running the show. In February 2020, Prima Kottu Mee signed Yohani as their Brand Ambassador for two years, as one of her first-ever significant brand endorsements. In the months that followed, Yohani got signed by Red Bull Records, with her debut single "Aaye" premiering in August 2020. The latter part of 2020 saw new releases, including Sitha Dawuna, a collaboration with Chamath Sangeeth in September 2020.

Her next song reverberated with citizens who endured a 30-year war on the island. She got 200 million views for a YouTube video "Manike Mage Hithe" cover song in May 2021. She had also completed her debut Sinhala album which features twelve songs and plans to launch it during a live concert around December 2021.

She performed her debut overseas tour as a music artiste in Hyderabad in India in October 2021 for a live concert with her band. On this tour, she joined two of India's most popular television shows, Salman Khan's Bigg Boss 15 and Ranveer Singh's Big Picture as a guest. While her cover of the song Manike Mage Hithe became popular, she released the first single from her first music album, "Kella", which was "Ithin Aadare".

She then lent her voice to the official song of the T20 Cricket World Cup in Sri Lanka in 2021 and released her first international single "Moving On" in English under the music label Red Bull Records. This made her the only Sri Lankan singer to release a song under Red Bull Records.

During her visit to India, she was honoured with the post of Indo-Ceylon Cultural Ambassador by the Government of India. She then performed "Unmada Prema Geeya" with popular Sri Lankan singers Bhathiya and Santhush and Kaizer Kaiz. In December 2021, she participated in the Dubai Expo 2020, later on contributing to the official song of LPL 2021 along with many popular singers of Sri Lanka.

The Tamil-Sinhala song "Rider Fighter" with ADK was released in the same month. In January 2022, she contributed a Tamil song composed by Harris Jayaraj and the Telugu song "What's happening" in the Telugu film Dhamaka composed by Bhima Ciceroleo. That month, she was called Sri Lankan of the year by LMD magazine.

In February 2022, she contributed to the song "Gajaman Nona" with Tehan Perera under the direction of Sandesh Bandara. After that she did a lot of work with the Dubai media and in between she contributed to sing the Hindi version of "Manike Mage Hite". She then released the patriotic song "You Are My Paradise" under the foundation So Sri Lanka. It contributed to the promotion of the tourism industry in Sri Lanka.

She then attended the Dubai Expo 2020 where she performed the biggest music concert ever held in Dubai Millennium Amphitheater with a huge crowd. A few more concerts were held in Dubai and then in March 2022, she, Chamath Sangeeth, Satheeshan and Dulan ARX won the SLIM Award for the most popular song of the year. She also hosted a YouTube concert called Eden with Lunu and in March 2022 she performed at the Yohani Live in Concert in Muscat, Oman.

In April 2022, she joined T-Series, the music label that owns the world's largest YouTube channel. In the face of the severe economic crisis in Sri Lanka that month, she established the "I am for Sri Lanka" foundation and contributed money to the treatment of people who were injured in the freedom struggle in Sri Lanka, and to the lack of medical equipment in the country at that time. She collected 5000 US dollars under that foundation and gave it to Red Cross organisation to fulfill the related tasks.

Sri Lankans boycotted her saying that her foundation was related to the existing government and therefore she remained silent for several months. After a few months, she was back in the limelight with the Hindi remake of "Manike Mage Hithe", named "Manike".

It became a milestone in Sri Lankan music as it was the first Hindi song to include Sinhala lyrics (of the original song). Tanishk Bagchi and Chamath Sangeeth composed the song and Rashmi Virag, Dulan ARX and Mellow D penned the lyrics. Along with Yohani, India's popular singer Jubin Nautiyal & Surya Raghunaathan featured in the song which is from the Bollywood movie Thank God. It released in October 2022 and features Indian actors Siddharth Malhotra, Ajay Devgan and Rakul Preet Singh along with Canadian artiste Nora Fatehi. The song gained popularity on Indian social media as well.

Her first Indian Song was "Po Po Po", a Tamil song in the film The Legend.

For promoting the movie Thank God, she featured on India's popular entertainment show The Kapil Sharma Show as a guest on Diwali. She then left for the Maldives where she participated in Chanaacha 2022. Also, she appeared in Sampath Bank's WePay advertisement.

On 10 November 2022, she crossed the one million followers mark on her Instagram account, making her the third Sri Lankan celebrity to reach one million followers, after Piyumi Hansamali and Dinakshi Priyasad.

In 2023, she contributed her vocals to the remake of the song "Jheda Nasha" which featured Nora Fatehi and Indian actor Ayushmann Khurrana in the Bollywood film An Action Hero.

Her third Hindi song and her first non-film Hindi song, "Tu Samane Aaye", was released in November 2022. Jubin Nautiyal also contributed his vocals to this song.

She then released the song "Chaudhary" in January 2023, also featuring the vocals of popular Rajasthani singer Mame Khan and Jubin Nautiyal. In February 2023, Don & D Entertainment organized two grand musical concerts of veteran Bollywood singer Udit Narayan in Melbourne and Sydney, Australia. Yohani also featured in these concerts. She held two more concerts in Kolkata and Raipur, India.

Months later, she performed a song in Sinhala titled "Medusa" on 4 March, with new singer Warunah.

== Discography ==
=== Non-film songs ===
Year	Song	Composer(s)	Singer	Writer(s)	Ref.
2020	"Merry Christmas Baby"	Yohani	Yohani	Dilanjan Seneviratne	
2020	"Aaye"	Yohani	Yohani	Dilanjan Seneviratne	
2020	"Rawwath Dasin"	Chanuka Mora	Yohani	Chanuka Mora	
2020	"Sitha Dawuna"	Chamath Sangeeth	Yohani	Dulan ARX, Hiyum, Dilanjan Seneviratne	
2020	"Cold Sunday"	Yohani	Yohani	Yohani	
2021	"Haal Massa (Viyole Viyole)"	Yohani	Yohani	Rajiv Sebastian	
2021	"Manike Mage Hithe" (Cover song)	Chamath Sangeeth	Yohani, Satheeshan	Dulan ARX	
2021	"Awidan Yanawa"	Shenal Maddumage	Yohani, Funky Dirt	Murshad Huvais	
2021	"Ithin Adare"	Yohani, Harinie Weerasinghe	Yohani	Dilanjan Seneviratne	
2021	"Moving On"	Yohani	Yohani	Dilanjan Seneviratne	
2021	"Unmaada Prema Geeya"	Chamitha Cooray	BnS, Yohani & Kaizer Kaiz	Nilar N Cassim	
2022	"Rider Fighter"	K2	ADK & Yohani	ADK	
2022	"Gajaman Nona" (ගජමන් නෝනා)	Yohani	Yohani, Tehan Perera	Ansaf Ameer	
2022	"So Sri Lanka"	Yohani	Yohani	Dilanjan Seneviratne	
2022	"Cold Sunday"	Yohani	Yohani	Yohani	
2022	"Tu Saamne Aaye"	Rocky – Jubin	Jubin Nautiyal & Yohani	Rocky Khanna	
2023	"Chaudhary "	Amit Trivedi	Yohani, Jubin Nautiyal & Mame Khan	Shellee	
2023	"Medusa"		Yohani & Warunaah		
2023	"Chunari Mein Daag"	Tony Kakkar	Tony Kakkar, Yohani & Ikka Singh	Tony Kakkar	

=== Film songs ===
Year	Film	Song	Co-singer(s)	Writer(s)	Composer(s)
2021	Shiddat	"Shiddat" (Female)		Manan Bhardwaj	
2022	The Legend	"Po Po Po "	KK, Jonita Gandhi, Prasad S N	Madhan Karky	Harris Jayaraj
2022	Thank God	"Manike"	Jubin Nautiyal	Rashmi Virag	Tanishk Bagchi
2022	An Action Hero	"Jehda Nasha"	IP Singh, Amar Jalal, Yohani, Harjot Kaur	Amar Jalal, Balla Jalal	Tanishk Bagchi
2022	Dhamaka	"What's Happening" – Yohani Version		Saraswati Putra Rama Jogaiah Shastry	Bheems Ceciroleo

== Controversy ==
Yohani's connection to the Sri Lankan military, particularly as the daughter of former army Major General Prasanna De Silva, who was involved in alleged war crimes and genocidal acts against Tamils during the Sri Lankan Civil War, has sparked controversy.

Her 2020 song "Rawwath Dasin" depicted her father as a hero who fought against terrorists and united the north and south of the country, despite his involvement in war crimes.

Many activists have condemned the glorification of her father's actions, viewing it as an attempt to whitewash the atrocities committed during the Sri Lankan Civil War through music.

Her education at the General Sir John Kotelawala Defence University, a military academy, has further fueled criticism.
