= MoeChakkaFire =

2024 single by Issey

Single by Issey
- Language: Japanese
- Released: July 19, 2024
- Genre: Hardbass
- Length: 2:35
- Label: VAP
- Lyricist: Issey
- Producer: Issey

Issey singles chronology
"Game Over" (2024)	"MoeChakkaFire" (2024)	"Arareya Kon Kon" (2024)

Music video
- "MoeChakkaFire" on YouTube

"MoeChakkaFire" (Japanese: モエチャッカファイア, Hepburn: Moechakkafaia) is a song by Japanese singer-songwriter Issey, released on July 19, 2024.

== Background ==
"MoeChakkaFire" was inspired by the character Ellen Joe from the video game Zenless Zone Zero. The lyrics are about Ellen Joe, who works at a maid café with a cold perspective, also reflecting on the story of the game. Hatsumino is in charge of the illustrations and animations depicted in the music video.

== Reception ==
"MoeChakkaFire" reached number one on the Billboard Japan Heatseekers Songs chart on September 23 and 29, 2024. It reached number one on the YouTube chart on September 27 and October 3 and October 4 and 10. It was third on Spotify's Daily Viral Songs in Japan.

The music video has been viewed more than a million times in the two weeks since its release. On July 5, 2025, in commemoration of the first anniversary of the song and Zenless Zone Zero, a cover version by Shion Wakayama, who voices Ellen Joe in the game, was released on YouTube and was featured on the HoYoFair program to coincide with Zenless Zone Zero's first anniversary.

== Charts ==
Weekly chart performance for "MoeChakkaFire"
Chart (2024)	Peak position
Japan (Japan Hot 100)	34
Japan Combined Singles (Oricon)	46
