= The Duck Song =

2009 song by Bryant Oden

- Video thumbnail on YouTube

Single by Bryant Oden

from the album Songdrops: 30 Songs for Kids
- Released: April 21, 2009
- Genre: Children's music; comedy; novelty; folk
- Length: 3:11
- Label: Songdrops
- Songwriter: Bryant Oden
- Producer: Bryant Oden

Bryant Oden singles chronology
"The Duck Song" (2009)	"The Christmas Duck Song" (2023)

External videos
- Original video uploaded to the Songdrops channel
- Animated video by forrestfire101

"The Duck Song" is a song by the American musician Bryant Oden. It was released as a lyric video to his YouTube channel on January 21, 2009. Following the creation of an animated video of the song by Forrest Whaley (forrestfire101) on March 23, the song went viral and Oden later released the song on digital distribution services on April 21 as the lead and only single of his debut album Songdrops: 30 Songs for Kids, which released November 1.

== Background and release ==
Before releasing the song, Bryant Oden was the owner of the now-defunct humor website innocentenglish.com. He spent about a year working on the album, starting in 2008 after his friends and family prompted him. Oden did not expect for the song to go viral, saying "I think I lucked into some kind of rare combination of a catchy tune, a good story based on an old joke, and a fun main character."

Forrest Whaley, known as forrestfire101 online, was fourteen years old when he animated the song. He initially reached out to Oden to make a music video for the song, to Oden's agreement. Whaley used Microsoft Paint to create the animation.

== Plot ==
A duck goes up to a man running a lemonade stand and asks him if he has any grapes, to a negative response. The man becomes progressively irritated by the duck as he returns, eventually reaching the point where he threatens to glue the duck to a tree. The duck, on the next day, then asks if the man has glue. He is rejected, but the duck asks again if he has any grapes. The man then takes the duck to a store to get grapes and, after eating the grapes, the duck then asks for lemonade and waddles away.

== Critical reception ==
In 2009, music reviewer Andrea Guy stated that the album was something "the kids will go wild for," while also praising the replayability and how they do not distract much when played in the background.

== Virality and legacy ==
In November 2009, the video had 5 million views. In December 2010, the video had 25 million views. In July 2011, the video had 50 million views. As of November 2026, the video has 695 million views.

On December 1, 2009, Oden released his second album, Songdrops 2: Bedtime Songs. It contains more relaxing music compared to his previous output and was met with confusion from music critics. However, Oden stated that the relaxing music is more meaningful to him and are more soulful to write.

In 2010, the song was adapted into a push-to-play children's book.

The song garnered sequels by Oden and Whaley, with "The Duck Song 2" on November 13, 2009, "The Duck Song 3" on April 2, 2010, "The Duck Song 4" on March 23, 2024. The final song, "The Duck Song 5", was released on October 11, 2024. In the sequels, a storyline developed. The duck finds a woman at a convenience store to annoy instead and then devises a plan to get her to meet the man. The man eventually becomes friendlier as the story develops and, in the final song, it is revealed that the man and woman are starting a family together and the duck has a family of his own. It ends off with the duck suggesting to the man to sell grape-flavored lemonade at his stand.

A Christmas-themed version of the song titled "The Christmas Duck Song" was also released, featuring Santa Claus in place of the lemonade stand man. The duo has also created a live-action version of the video with a CGI duck. Unofficial homages and parodies have also become popular.
