= Dr. Jean =

American singer (born 1947)

Dr. Jean Rosenberg Feldman
- Born: Jean Rosenberg Feldman; March 15, 1947 (age 78); Milan, Tennessee, U.S.
- Education: Georgia State University (M.A., PhD); Emory University
- Musical career
- Genres: Children's
- Occupations: Teacher; author; singer
- Instrument: Vocals
- Website: drjean.org

YouTube information
- Channel: Dr. Jean
- Years active: 1998–present
- Genre: Education
- Subscribers: 185 thousand
- Views: 102 million
- Last updated: 26 December 2025
- Website: drjean.org

Jean Rosenberg Feldman (born March 15, 1947, in Milan, Tennessee), better known as Dr. Jean, is an American teacher, author, and musical artist. She is well known for her children's learning songs. Dr. Jean has a PhD in Curriculum and Instruction, an M.A. in Early Childhood from Georgia State University, and a Diploma for Advanced Study in Teaching from Emory University. Dr. Jean has been educating for over 40 years and has created many resources for teachers in the classroom with their students.

== "Dr. Jean's Banana Dance" ==
On April 30, 2010, Dr. Jean released a music video for her song, produced and edited by Kenny Veenstra, "Dr. Jean's Banana Dance". "The Guacamole Song", the incorrect but more well-known name for "Dr. Jean's Banana Dance", rose rapidly in October and November 2015. The song gained 33 million views and quickly became an internet meme. It was featured on an episode of Kids React by the Fine Brothers. Since then, Dr. Jean has uploaded more music videos of her songs which has earned her over 87.4 million views and 169,000 subscribers on YouTube as of April 10, 2022.

== Discography ==
- Nursery Rhymes and Good Ol' Times (2002)
- Kiss Your Brain (2003)
- All Day Long (2004)
- Totally Math (2006)
- Is Everybody Happy? (2007)
- Dr. Jean and Friends (2007)
- Totally Reading (2007)
- Just for Fun (2011)
