= The Mae Shi =

American experimental punk band

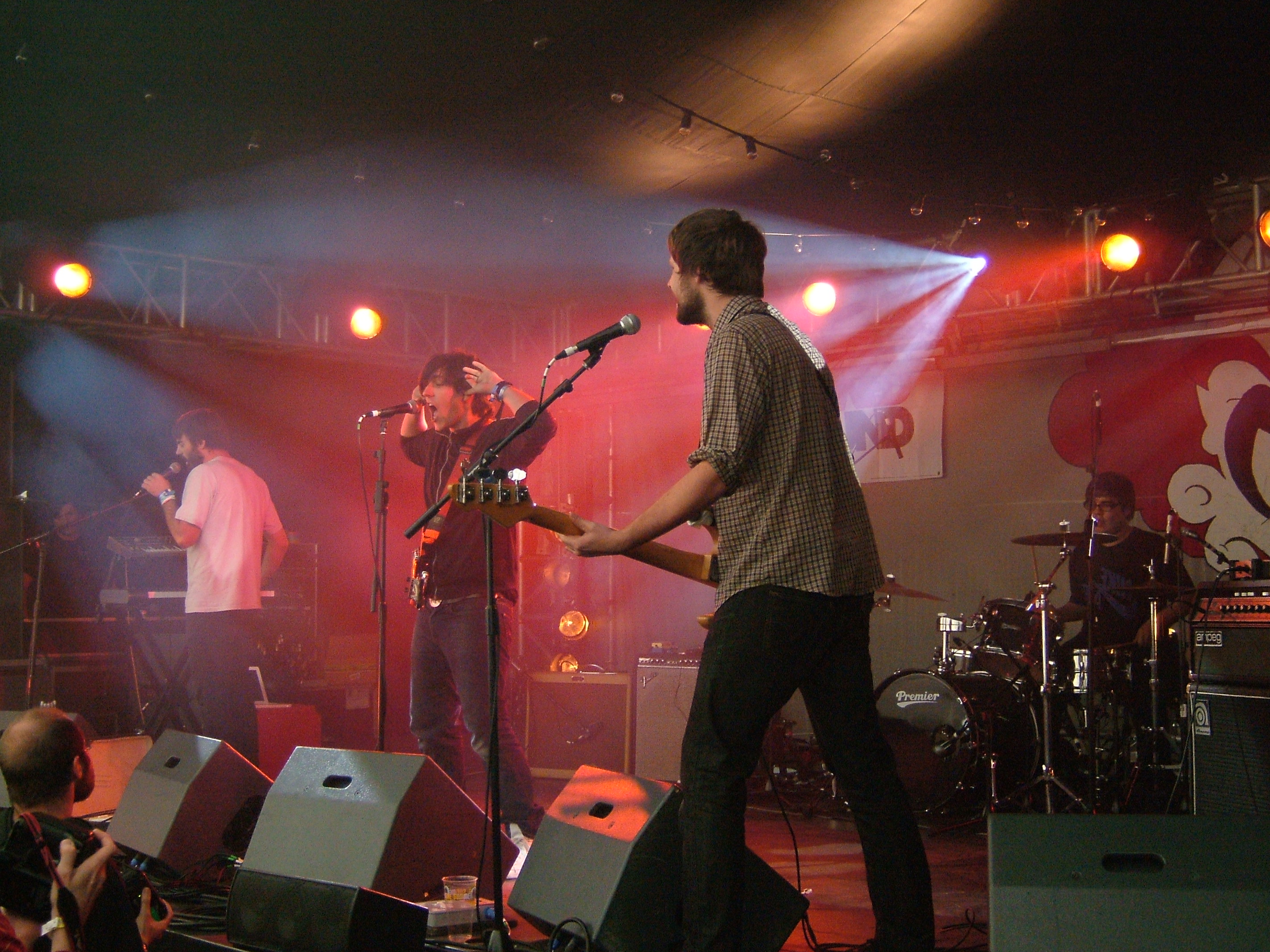
- Performing at Summer Sundae, August 2008

Background information
- Origin: Los Angeles, California, United States
- Genres: Art punk; experimental pop; indie rock; experimental rock; post-hardcore
- Years active: 2002–2009; 2012; 2016; 2022–present
- Labels: Kill Rock Stars; Moshi Moshi; Strictly Amateur Films; Join or Die; Team Shi
- Members: Jeff Byron; Tim Byron
- Past members: Ezra Buchla; Corey Fogel; Marcus Savino; Brad Breeck; Jonathan Gray; Bill Gray; Jacob Cooper; William Esperanto Gray

The Mae Shi is an American art punk and experimental pop band from Los Angeles, California, formed in 2002. They are known for making frantic and joyous music that explores dark themes using a wide variety of sounds, instruments, and music genres. Their music has been described as "spazz rock," "avant-pop," "surprise music," "hyper-prog," and "punk with a bubblegum soul." They are closely associated with The Smell, an all-ages, volunteer-run venue in Los Angeles. Their third album, HLLLYH, was released to critical acclaim, with Pitchfork naming it the eighteenth best album of 2008.

== History ==
The band was formed by Tim Byron and Ezra Buchla, who had known each other for years, having spent time growing up in the Los Angeles suburb of Claremont together—Jeff Byron and Buchla were classmates at Claremont High School and close friends. Originally, Tim played guitar, Buchla played a collection of 30-year-old Buchla modules and sang, and varying drummers accompanied them. When Jeff graduated from college, he joined the band on guitar and Tim moved to bass. After a few months of practicing together, the three met Brad Breeck, who was studying at the California Institute of Arts with Buchla and had performed versions of John Zorn's "strategy game piece" Cobra in an ensemble led by Buchla. (The ensemble also featured future Mae Shi drummer Corey Fogel).

The band began performing live in 2003. More shows throughout Los Angeles followed, and the band gained a reputation for its high-energy performances. Soon after, they released their first EP, To Hit Armor Class Zero, on the label Byron runs, Join or Die. They embarked on a tour in the summer of 2003, playing shows on the West coast. In Olympia, WA, they met Kill Rock Stars/5RC founder Slim Moon, with whom they kept in touch after the show.

Through the fall of 2003 and winter of 2004, they worked on their debut LP, recording songs in their living rooms and bedrooms using borrowed gear. They sent a CD-R of the record to Moon in April 2004, and one week later in an Instant Messenger conversation, he offered to release it on Kill Rock Stars' sister label 5 Rue Christine. Terrorbird was released in July 2004, and the band embarked on a 31-day, 32-show tour to promote it, without using a booking agent. The band played with bands such as Fat Day and Rapider Than Horsepower. To promote their first LP to say thanks to their mostly Los Angeles-based fanbase, they released The Mae Shi 2004 Mixtape. The 70-minute tape collects their favorite parts from their favorite 2000 songs.

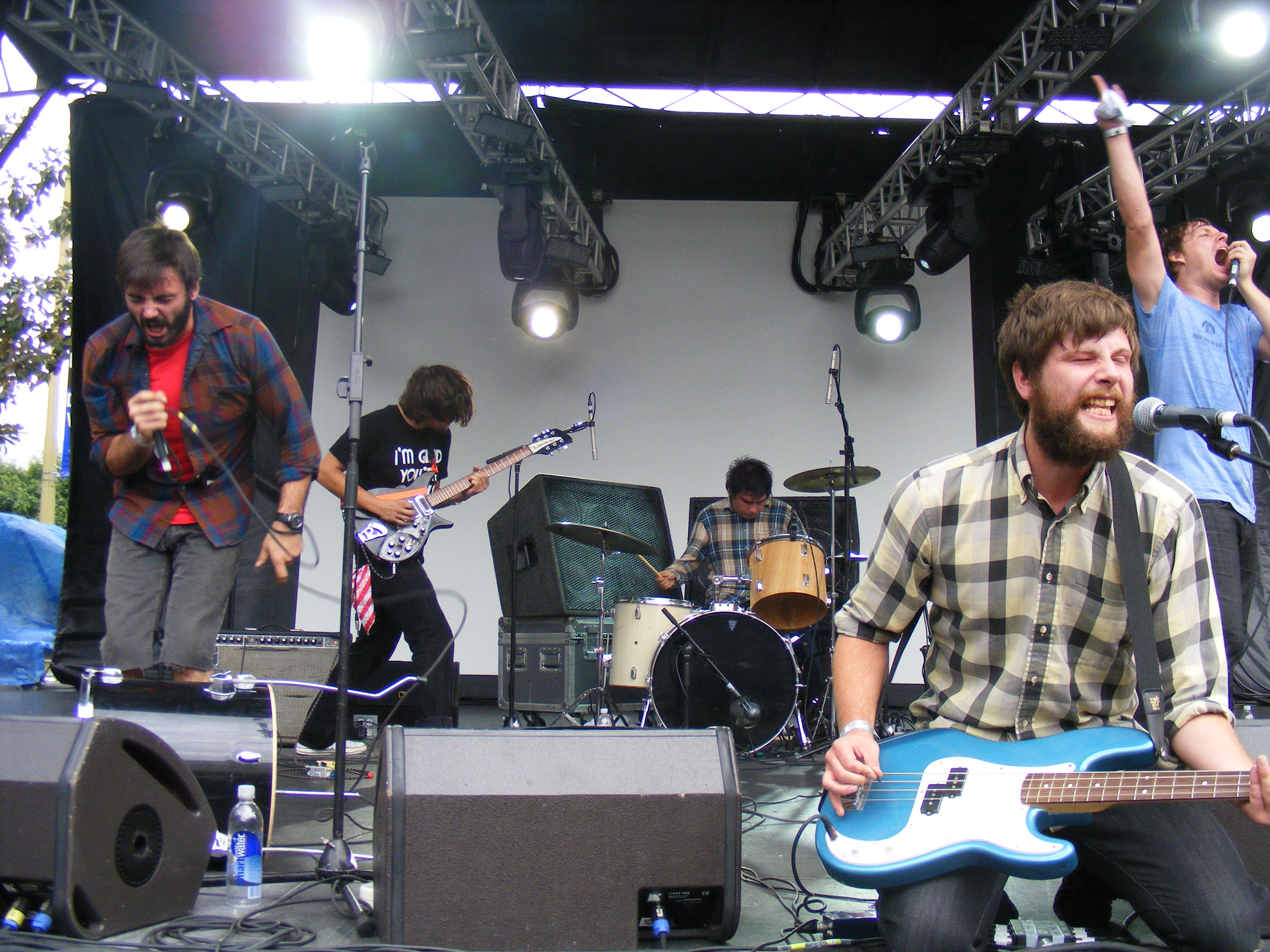
The Mae Shi performing at the Detour Festival in Los Angeles.

In 2005, they released an EP (titled Heartbeeps for the U.S. version released by 5RC and Go Zbra by Swedish label Deleted Art), and a split LP with Rapider Than Horsepower called Do Not Ignore the Potential on Narshardaa in Europe (released in January 2006 on Strictly Amateur Films in the U.S). They embarked on a five-week tour of Europe in May 2005 with the band Rapider Then Horsepower. Upon returning to the US in June 2005, they were named "best punk/hardcore band" in the LA Weekly's 2005 Music Awards.

In October 2005, they embarked on another US tour. Corey Fogel, who joined the band in the middle of their European tour as a mid-tour replacement for Breeck when he suffered a family emergency, joined the band full-time as drummer, with Breeck switching to guitar, keyboards and drums. To help fund the tour, they released two limited edition CD-Rs, I and II.

Their debut DVD, Lock The Skull, Load The Gun, was released in April 2006 on 5RC. It combined 32 music videos made by friends and fans with an hour-long tour documentary chronicling their Celebration Tour. In July 2006, it was announced that Buchla had left the band approximately two months before. Fogel has also since left the band. Both departing members formed the group Gowns. Breeck returned to playing the drums, and it was announced in September/October 2006 that Jonathan Gray had joined the band as singer/guitarist.

Although the band decided to not play outside of their LA home after their Fall 2005 tour, they participated in a small two-week East Coast tour in August 2007 with Yea Big + Kid Static. On the tour, the band offered two limited edition CD-Rs, "III" ('HLLLYH' out-takes and demos) and IIII (Kingdom Come out-takes), along with a limited release of HLLLYH on cassette. The same year they appeared in the film What We Do Is Secret performing as The Screamers in The Masque scene, playing a cover version of the Germs' "Sex Boy" with Rich Moreno playing the role of Tomata du Plenty.

On December 2, 2007 the band debuted Bill Gray and Marcus Savino in their live line up to replace bassist Tim Byron and drummer Brad Breeck, who continued on with the Mae Shi, but stopped touring with them. With their new line up, they embarked on a 4-day West Coast tour with The Germs in late December 2007, followed by a two-week tour in the UK during January/February 2008 promoting their new album. Savino left the Mae Shi shortly thereafter, and Jacob Cooper (of Bark Bark Bark) joined the crew as they prepared to tour more. They played 18 shows at SXSW (South by South-West Festival) in March 2008.

Their third release, HLLLYH, was released on the labels Moshi Moshi (UK) and Team Shi (America) on February 11, 2008. They are already working on a new EP featuring all six current members of The Mae Shi. The Mae Shi has currently been chosen as one of the "Best New Bands" of California by Boston Phoenix Annual 50 Best Bands in America.

In 2009, the band went on an extended hiatus, with Jon Gray, Bill Gray, and Cooper departing to form Signals and Jeff Byron and Tim Byron announcing they would continue to work as The Mae Shi. In 2009, Jeff Byron started a band with rapper Busdriver called Physical Forms. Breeck and formed a band called Skull Tape; its 2011 album The Invisible Hand and the Descent of Man, features Jon Gray on synths.

In 2012, the original Mae Shi lineup of Buchla, Breeck, Tim Byron and Jeff Byron reunited to play a show at Pehrspace, a Los Angeles all-ages venue. In 2016, a lineup of Buchla, Tim Byron, Jeff Byron, and Fogel reunited to play a benefit for The Smell, another Los Angeles all-ages venue.

In 2022 and 2023, the Mae Shi announced via its Twitter page that the band was working on a new album.

== Discography ==
=== Albums ===
- Terrorbird (2004, S.A.F. Records)
- Do Not Ignore the Potential (split with Rapider Than Horsepower) (2006, S.A.F. Records/Narshardaa Records)
- HLLLYH (2007, Team Shi Records)

=== Compilations ===
- I (2005, Entropic Tarot)
- II (2005, Entropic Tarot)
- III (2007)
- IIII (2007)

=== Singles & EPs ===
- To Hit Armor Class Zero (2003, S.A.F. Records)
- Heartbeeps (2005, 5 Rue Christine)
- Fancy Wool Hats and Coats / Animal Birth Control's Mae Shi Hate Peanut Butter Remix (with Anni Rossi) (2005, Deathbomb Arc)
- Run to Your Grave (2008, Moshi Moshi Records)
- Lamb & Lion (2008, Moshi Moshi Records)
- R U Professional (2009)
- Yea Big Presents HLLL YEA (with Yea Big + Kid Static) (2015, Metal Postcard)

=== DVDs ===
- Lock The Skull, Load The Gun (2004, 5 Rue Christine)

=== Compilation appearances ===
- "Body 2" on Yeah! Fest! Volume 2 (2004, Yeah! Fest!)
- "Takoma The Dolphin Is AWOL" on Burn My Eye! (2004, Burn My Eye/Plastic Donkey/Rimbaud Records)
- "The Potential" on Music For Robots Volume 1 (2005, Music for Robots)
- "Vampire Beats" on Video Fanzine III (2005, Kill Rock Stars)
- "Remarkably Dirty Animals" on Sur La Mer Samp-Le-Mer (2006, 5 Rue Christine)
- "Split LP Rapider Than Horsepower" on The Discography CD '07 (2007, Narshardaa Records)
- "Pwnd" on Musikexpress 134 - Sounds Now! (2008, Musikexpress)
- "Hlllyh" on Sound Check No. 106 (2008, Rock Sound)
- "Run To Your Grave" on Autumn Sampler 2008 (2008, Nettwerk Music Group)
- "Run To Your Grave" on Mr. Shovel's Check One... Two Volume IV LA/OC Local Music 08 (2007, Indie 103.1)
- "Vampire Beats" on S.A.F. Records - Sampler 2008 (2008, S.A.F. Records)
- "Lamb and Lion" on Live From The Devil's Triangle Vol. 11 (2008, KFJC)
- "Pwnd" on La Vida (The Hi-Lo Tunez Plan: 9th Step) (2008, Hi-Lo Tunez)
- "Run To Your Grave" on Moshi Moshi Records (2008, Go Mag/Moshi Moshi Records)
- "Boys In The Attic" on Panache Lovepump SXSW '08 (2008)
- "Kingdom Come" on Illegal Sound (2009, Živel)
- "Live At The Smell" on Live At The Smell (2009, Cold Hands Video)
- "Lamb and the Lion" on 20 Years of Moshi Moshi (2019, Moshi Moshi Records)
