= Lucian Piane =

American composer and music producer (1980–2026)

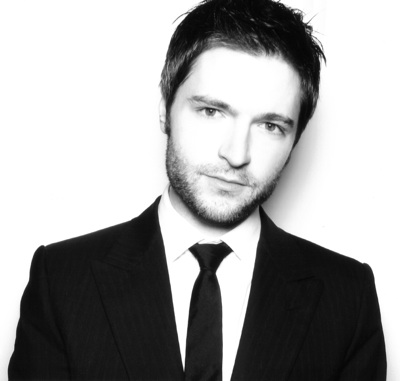
- Piane in 2009
- Born: Lucian Michael Piane III; October 4, 1980; Kansas City, Missouri, U.S.
- Died: October 12, 2026 (aged 46); Glendale, California, U.S.
- Other name: RevoLucian
- Education: New York University
- Occupations: Composer, record producer
- Notable work: "Bale Out"; RuPaul's Drag Race

Lucian Michael Piane III (October 4, 1980 – October 12, 2026), also known by the Internet nickname RevoLucian, was an American composer and record producer. He composed music for several films, television shows, theater productions and singers, and received a RIAA Platinum Album Award for his production work on Hairspray: Soundtrack to the Motion Picture. Piane also achieved Internet fame under the name RevoLucian for his satirical techno remixes, most notably "Bale Out", which featured profanity-laced tirades from actor Christian Bale made on the set of Terminator Salvation.

== Career ==
Piane worked closely with composer and songwriter Marc Shaiman; the two collaborated on such films as Team America: World Police, Rumor Has It... and Hairspray, as well as the Broadway show Martin Short: Fame Becomes Me, and the 76th Academy Awards. Piane received a Recording Industry Association of America Platinum Album Award for his production work on New Line Records' Hairspray: Soundtrack to the Motion Picture, which was also nominated for a Grammy Award.

He composed scores for the HBO documentary An Omar Broadway Film and the film Pretty Ugly People. He wrote the song "Year End Rap" which blogger Perez Hilton performed on his VH1 special, What Perez Sez. Piane also wrote the song "Stunning" for Calpernia Addams for her reality television show, Transamerican Love Story. Piane lived ́in Los Angeles, California, and in 2009 worked on the album Champion by RuPaul. Piane composed the music for the 2009 horror film, Sorority Row, and arranged music for a song and video called "The Clap" by Perez Hilton, recorded for the motion picture soundtrack of the film Another Gay Sequel: Gays Gone Wild. In 2011 he teamed up with RuPaul again producing the album Glamazon. His third album with RuPaul, Born Naked, was released in 2014.

=== Remixes ===
Piane in 2008

Published under his online name RevoLucian, Piane released remixes featuring Barbra Streisand, Alaska Governor Sarah Palin, political commentator Bill O'Reilly, and Andrew Meyer, who received national media attention when he was tasered by police during a speech given by U.S. Senator John Kerry at the University of Florida. Piane described his remixes as "just a hobby." Louis Bayard of Salon highlighted Piane's remix of the O'Reilly outburst made public in 2008, in their "Critics' Picks" column.

Piane attracted particularly strong attention for "Bale Out", a three-minute-long techno remix featuring audio clips from a profanity-laced tirade actor Christian Bale delivered to cinematographer Shane Hurlbut on the set of Terminator Salvation. Piane made the song shortly after Bale attracted national media attention in February 2009. He initially heard the audio of Bale while working on an album for RuPaul. The song was posted on the websites MySpace and YouTube on February 2, 2009, and received over 200,000 views within one day. By February 4, 2009, it had received 700,000 views.

Piane said "I think most people are enjoying it. I don't know if Christian Bale is enjoying it, but I hope he does. I think I've taken something that maybe made him look really bad and turned it into something that all these people are enjoying." In an interview with E!: Entertainment Television, Christian Bale said "It was a good remix. They did a good job." After receiving a remix of his outburst from a friend, Bale said "They did a bloody good job! I've gotta say, what a great impulse, you know? To take something ugly like that and make it into a dance? That's a wonderful thing." McG, the director of Terminator Salvation, has praised "Bale Out".

== Personal life and death ==
Lucian Michael Piane III was born in Kansas City, Missouri, on October 4, 1980. He graduated from The Barstow School in 1999. He graduated from New York University in 2003 with a Bachelor of Music in musical composition. Piane was openly gay.

In September 2021, Piane was arrested for drunken intoxication and felony vandalism of a bank. In August 2026, Piane posted on social media that he was relapsing following being sober for over a year.

Piane was hit by a car and died in Glendale, California, on October 12, 2026, at age 46.

== Awards and nominations ==
Year	Award	Organization	Work	Category	Result	Ref.
2007	Grammy Award	National Academy of Recording Arts and Sciences	Hairspray	Best Compilation Soundtrack Album for a Motion Picture, Television or Other Visual Media	Nominated	
2007	Platinum Album Award	Recording Industry Association of America	Hairspray	Soundtrack	Won	
2010	Webby Award	International Academy of Digital Arts and Sciences	"Bale Out"	Best Video Remixes/Mashups	Nominated	

== See also ==
- List of Internet phenomena
- List of YouTube celebrities
- Mashup (music)
- Sound collage
