= Manike Mage Hithe =

2020 song by Satheeshan and Dulan ARX

"Manike Mage Hithe (මැණිකේ මගේ හිතේ)"

Song by Yohani, Satheeshan Rathnayaka, Dulan ARX and Chamath Sangeeth
- Language: Sinhala
- Released: July 2020 (original); 22 May 2021 (cover)
- Recorded: 2020 (original), 2021 (cover)
- Studio: C Music Studio Sri Lanka
- Length: 2:47
- Label: C Music, Bonfire (on behalf of C Music)
- Composer: Chamath Sangeeth
- Lyricist: Dulan ARX
- Producer: Chamath Sangeeth

Music video
- "Manike Mage Hithe" on YouTube

"Manike Mage Hithe" (Sinhala: මැණිකේ මගේ හිතේ, lit. 'Precious in My Mind') is a Sri Lankan Sinhala-language song by Yohani, Satheeshan Rathnayaka, Dulan ARX and Chamath Sangeeth.

An official cover for the song was done by Chamath Sangeeth and released on 22 May 2021. The lyrics were written by Dulan ARX. The cover crossed 190 million views on YouTube in three months. It was dubbed into a number of languages, viewed across South Asia, and reached high positions on a number of charts worldwide.

The video song also marked the first major breakthrough viral marketing in Sri Lanka.

== About ==
=== Original ===
The original song "Manike Mage Hithe" was produced by Chamath Sangeeth in July 2020 during the COVID-19 pandemic lockdown in Sri Lanka. It was directed by Hasith Aryan (Hasitha Vithanage) and sung by Satheeshan Ratnayake & rapped by Dulan ARX.

=== Cover ===
The cover was uploaded on YouTube on 22 May 2021 coinciding with the Republic Day of Sri Lanka.

=== Music video ===
The music video features Yohani and Satheeshan in the background crooning the lyrics of the song.

=== Dubbing ===
The song was later dubbed in many Indian languages including Telugu, Kannada, Tamil, Malayalam, Marathi, Hindi, Punjabi, Bengali, Bhojpuri, Assamese, Kokborok and Gujarati and international languages such as Nepali, Portuguese, German, Spanish, Somali and English by different artists. The Tamil and Malayalam versions of the song were sung by Yohani herself and were published on YouTube on 28 August 2021. On 19 October 2021, Indra Kumar, the director of the film "Thank God", announced that Yohani will be singing the Hindi version of this song and it will be recomposed by Tanishk Bagchi and rewritten by Rashmi Virag.

== Reception ==
The song has become the second cover after "Shape of You - Sri Lankan Mashup" by three member DeepSounds to go massively viral in Sri Lanka and the first ever to have a wider global outreach.

The song surpassed 232+ million views on YouTube.

The song debuted at number 8 on the Asian Music Chart Top 40 on 24 September 2021.

== Charts ==
Platform	Chart Title	Peak position
Official Charts Company (UK)	Asian Music Chart Top 40	8
