= Dose (magazine) =

Canadian news website and former daily print magazine

Dose is a daily Canadian news website and former daily print magazine. It was a mixture of standalone features and coverage of daily news, sometimes from an irreverent perspective. Each daily issue had a theme, and the top margins of every page usually included trivia items related to the theme.

== History ==
Dose magazine was launched on April 4, 2005, and was distributed in five major Canadian cities: Toronto, Vancouver, Calgary, Edmonton, and Ottawa. Different news articles from the five cities are still featured on the website. The magazine hoped to earn revenue through advertising and selling mobile content (via the website) and was aimed at the lucrative demographic of 18- to 34-year-olds. The website targets this market too.

Dose was published by Noah Godfrey, son of CanWest board of directors member Paul Godfrey. The content team included editor-in-chief, Pema Hegan and creative director, Jaspal Riyait. The magazine was the product of Canwest Mediaworks Publications Inc. (originally the Calgary Herald Group), which was in turn part of the same corporate conglomerate, Canwest, that publishes the National Post, among many other newspapers in Canada, including the Montreal Gazette and the Ottawa Citizen. Canwest also controlled the Global television network in Canada.

Known for its artistic covers, Dose magazine won design awards at Communication Arts, Society for News Design, Society of Illustrators and the Canadian National Magazine Awards.

On May 17, 2006, Canwest discontinued publication of the print edition of Dose, but indicated that the magazine's online presence and selling of mobile content would continue.

On July 14, 2010, Canwest completed the sale of its publishing division, which includes Dose, to the new company Postmedia Network.

== Layout ==
The magazine was published 5 days a week (Monday to Friday) in a 23" × 12.5" format that is slightly smaller than a tabloid. (It was, when folded, 11.5" × 12.5", which is almost a square.) Although labelled a magazine, it was printed on newsprint like a newspaper and had the same dimensions as the type of advertising "pull-out" sections currently favored by the CanWest Global chain. The magazine was 20 pages from Monday through Thursday (daily edition) and 24 pages on Friday (weekend edition). Weekly editions included sections such as:

- Home—headlines, weather, etc., akin to the front page of newspapers
- News—the feature article, plus an assortment of news and editorials (including fashion news)
- Goods—new or interesting products to check out
- Rub—celebrity news and gossip
- the Spread—the centre spread (with one article)
- Fix—assorted entertainment reviews
- Go—local concert and events listings
- Working—employment advice and local job listings
- Play—sports
- Hey—featuring comments on a selected issue by random ordinary folks
- Overdose—the last page, with humorous horoscopes, a letter column, crossword puzzles, Sex Advice from Strangers, etc.

== Recent years ==
In 2013 Dose.ca became a Newad property. The website now features a cleaner and bolder look and has expanded its previous mission to cover a larger spectrum of the entertainment news. The site offers coverage of the music scene, pop culture, trends, new openings, the arts and celebrities.
