= Super Max! =

Single by Pitstop Boys
- Language: Dutch
- Released: 16 July 2016
- Length: 3:45
- Label: Longstream Media
- Songwriter: Niels Lingbeek
- Producer: Niels Lingbeek

Pitstop Boys singles chronology
"Super Max!" (2016)	"Super Max! Yohé, Yoho!" (2021)

"Super Max!" is a song performed by Dutch band Pitstop Boys, who are fans of Dutch Formula One driver Max Verstappen. The song was released on 16 July 2016, accompanied by a music video.

== Background ==
Max Verstappen is a Dutch Formula One driver who made his debut in the series in 2015, driving for Toro Rosso. In 2016 at the Spanish Grand Prix, he would switch seats with Daniil Kvyat, moving to Red Bull Racing, the senior team for Red Bull. He won in his first race with Red Bull, becoming the youngest ever winner, the youngest driver to score a podium finish and the youngest ever to lead a lap of a Formula One race, breaking the previous records held by Sebastian Vettel. In the process, he also became the first Dutchman to win a Grand Prix and the first Grand Prix winner born in the 1990s.

The Pitstop Boys are a group of two (formerly three) Verstappen fans, Rob Toonen and Jeroen Hilgenberg (and formerly Marco Mars), who are part of the "Oranje Leger" (lit. 'Orange army'), a colloquial name for Verstappen's supporters.

A follow-up to the song was made for Verstappen's title run against Lewis Hamilton in the 2021 season, titled "Super Max! Yohé, Yoho!". They also made another song, "Let's Go Lando", in support of British Formula One driver Lando Norris. And in 2023 they made another new song called "Vamos Fernando" in support of Fernando Alonso who had a strong start to 2023 for Aston Martin.

== Reception ==
The song became a viral hit, after Verstappen continued to gain success in Formula One. The song was used as a fight song for whenever Verstappen won, as an Internet meme for anything that Verstappen did, or as a chant within the "Oranje Army". Verstappen was embarrassed at first by the song. He won his first drivers' championship in the 2021 season, causing the song to chart on Spotify's Viral 50 in several countries, including hitting number one in the Netherlands, and number five in the global chart. Verstappen was also seen partying to the song after his championship win. The song was also played prior to the start of the 2021 Dutch Grand Prix, Verstappen's first-ever home race in his Formula One career.

== Track listing ==
Digital download, streaming
No.	Title	Length
1.	"Super Max!"	3:45
