= Buckwheat Boyz =

American novelty music group

- Origin: Miami, Florida, U.S.
- Genre: Miami bass
- Years active: 1997–2002
- Label: Koch Records

The Buckwheat Boyz were an American novelty bass music group from Miami, Florida that were signed to Koch Records, and released one single, "Peanut Butter & Jelly", in 2001.

"Peanut Butter & Jelly", produced by Chip-Man, became a popular internet meme after an animated music video featuring a dancing banana garnered attention online. The popularity of the meme gained such traction that it was referenced in Family Guy and the song itself featured in an episode of The Proud Family.

== Legacy ==
Their song "Ice Cream and Cake" rose in popularity after being featured in a 2009 Baskin-Robbins marketing campaign, which included a television commercial and an Ice Cream and Cake Dance Video Contest. In August 2009, Baskin-Robbins kicked off the contest by hosting the Guinness World Records Largest Cheerleading Dance event with Mario Lopez of Extra TV and 225 members of the Universal Cheerleaders Association (UCA), at the University of California Los Angeles. However, as of August 2011, the Guinness World Records archive states that the record for largest cheerleading dance was set in November 2009 by 297 participants at the University of Memphis in Memphis, Tennessee. It is not known whether this event was related to the Baskin-Robbins contest.

Old Dominion University plays "Ice Cream and Cake" at home basketball and football games, which encourages active crowd dance participation.
