= List of music considered the worst =

This list consists of notable albums or songs considered the worst examples of popular music, based on reviews, polls and sentiment from music critics, musicians and the public.

== Albums ==
=== 1960s–1970s ===
Philosophy of the World, the Shaggs (1969)
The Shaggs were formed in 1965 by the teenage sisters Dorothy, Betty and Helen Wiggin. Though they had no interest in becoming musicians, they were forced to write, rehearse and record an album by their father, who believed that his mother had predicted their rise to fame. They composed bizarre songs with untuned guitars, erratic time signatures, disconnected rhythms, wandering melodies and rudimentary lyrics about pets and families. Many listeners wondered if their album Philosophy of the World was the worst ever recorded, including the Rolling Stone writer Chris Conelly. In a 1999 profile for The New Yorker, Susan Orlean wrote that "depending on whom you ask, the Shaggs were either the best band of all time or the worst". In 2022, Vice wrote that the Shaggs were the "best worst band of all time", and a 2025 Guardian article described them as "the world's worst band". In 2026, The Times called Philosophy of the World the worst album of all time.
Lord Sutch and Heavy Friends, Screaming Lord Sutch (1970)
Screaming Lord Sutch, a pioneer of shock rock, was backed on this album by a supergroup including some of Britain's best-known rock musicians, such as Led Zeppelin's Jimmy Page and John Bonham, Jeff Beck, session keyboardist Nicky Hopkins, and Noel Redding of the Jimi Hendrix Experience. Many of the guest musicians disowned the album upon its release. It was mentioned as the worst record ever released in a 1998 BBC poll. Rolling Stone called Sutch "absolutely terrible" and lamented that the guest musicians were made to sound "like a fouled parody of themselves".
Attila, Attila (1970)
Attila is the only album by the psychedelic rock duo Attila, which featured a young Billy Joel. Stephen Thomas Erlewine of AllMusic called it "the worst album released in the history of rock & roll—hell, the history of recorded music itself." Joel described it as "psychedelic bullshit".
Popular Classics and Hallelujah! — Portsmouth Sinfonia Live at the Albert Hall, Portsmouth Sinfonia (1974)
The Portsmouth Sinfonia, formed in 1970 in Portsmouth, England, was composed of members who could not play their instruments and described themselves as "the world's worst orchestra". The 1979 Rolling Stone Record Guide wrote that their first two albums were perhaps the worst ever made and "best dismissed as an intellectual joke".
Having Fun with Elvis on Stage, Elvis Presley (1974)
The album is a compilation of excerpts from Presley's concerts, containing almost no actual music and instead consisting mainly of banter and jokes between numbers without context. The album was devised by Colonel Tom Parker to serve as a Presley recording for which he would own all of the rights and thus be entitled to all of the profits, since there would be no songs; the plan failed as Presley's label RCA Records claimed the rights to the record anyway. It topped Jimmy Guterman and Owen O'Donnell's titular list in the 1991 book The Worst Rock and Roll Records of All Time.
Metal Machine Music, Lou Reed (1975)
Consisting entirely of manipulated recordings of audio feedback, Metal Machine Music was ranked at number two in The Worst Rock 'n' Roll Records of All Time. In 2005, Q magazine included the album in a list of "Ten Terrible Records by Great Artists" and ranked it No. 4 in its list of the 50 worst albums of all time. Village Voice rock critic Robert Christgau damned it with faint praise: "Though it is a blatant rip-off, it is not--philistine cavils to the contrary--totally unlistenable."
Soundtrack to Sgt. Pepper's Lonely Hearts Club Band, various artists (1978)
The glam rock and disco Beatles cover soundtrack album was named the "worst ever" on Maxim's April 2000 list of pop albums from the 1970s to 1990s. The Sgt. Pepper's movie soundtrack was the first album in history to achieve "return platinum" status as stores took over four million copies of it off their shelves to ship back to their distributors. RSO Records destroyed hundreds of thousands of copies, crippling the company with a large financial loss.

=== 1980s–1990s ===
Elvis' Greatest Shit, Elvis Presley (1982)
A posthumous bootleg compilation album consisting largely of outtakes and a selection of Presley's movie soundtrack songs of the 1960s that was made to deliberately highlight the worst of his career. Critics largely agreed that the compiler of the record succeeded in picking Presley's worst work.

Thank You, Duran Duran (1995)
Thank You is a cover album named the worst-ever album by Q magazine in March 2006. Q's deputy editor Gareth Grundy said: "Duran Duran was the one that united everyone in agreement. We put it on in the office to remind ourselves how bad it was. Sometimes these things are redeemed by some sort of kitsch or novelty value, but it didn't even have that. It's not funny for even a split second and not even the sort of thing that you would put on for a laugh if you were drunk." Ken Scott, the engineer of the album, also thought "it turned out pretty badly" and the band considered it commercial suicide. Chris Gerard of Metro Weekly ranked it as Duran Duran's worst album.

=== 2000s–2020s ===
Playing with Fire, Kevin Federline (2006)
The only album recorded by Kevin Federline, ex-husband of Britney Spears, Playing with Fire is review aggregator Metacritic's lowest-scoring album to date, with a rating of 15. It was also a commercial failure, with first-week sales of only 6,000 in the U.S.
Chinese Democracy, Guns N' Roses (2008)
The album was mired in development hell for eight years, and it received widely polarized responses ranging from very positive to scathing. Popular music historian Stephen Davis named it "the worst album ever." Music editor Ayre Dworken wrote: "Chinese Democracy is the worst album I have heard in years, if not in all my life of listening to music." It was included in Wired magazine's unranked list of the "5 Audio Atrocities to Throw Down a Sonic Black Hole" and placed first on Guitar Player's "10 Awful Albums by 10 Amazing Bands" list. Chinese Democracy was ranked as the worst record of 2008 by several publications, including Time Out New York, Asbury Park Press and IGN. The Chicago Tribune noted the record in its end-of-year appraisal of 2008's worst in arts and entertainment. However, Rolling Stone, The Guardian, Spin, ABC News and Ultimate Classic Rock included the album on best-of year-end lists.
Eoghan Quigg, Eoghan Quigg (2009)
Quigg's only album was met with derision and has been described by numerous reviewers as the worst record ever made. One such writer was Peter Robinson of The Guardian, who called it an "album so bad that it would count as a new low for popular culture were it possible to class as either culture... or popular". and said on his Popjustice website that "decades into the future, Eoghan Quigg's album Eoghan Quigg will be the one that scoops the accolade" of worst record of all time. Gigwise placed the album at number one on its 20 Worst Albums of 2009 list.
Lulu, Lou Reed and Metallica (2011)
Pitchfork's Stuart Berman awarded the album a score of 1.0/10 and wrote that Lulu disappoints even in its "worst of all time" status; "for all the hilarity that ought to ensue here, Lulu is a frustratingly noble failure." NME also noted that the album was "one of the worst reviewed albums ever" and "one of the most critically panned albums of recent years". In response to massive backlash from Metallica fans, Lou Reed stated: "I don't have any fans left. After Metal Machine Music, they all fled. Who cares? I'm in this for the fun of it." David Bowie and Reed's widow Laurie Anderson, however, have praised the album.
Streets in the Sky, the Enemy (2012)
Daily Record writer Rick Fulton reported that several of his readers considered Streets in the Sky to be "among the very worst releases of the year [2012], and indeed, all time". Critics were similarly harsh; the album is the second-lowest-rated ever at review aggregator site AnyDecentMusic?, and was the worst-reviewed of 2012 at fellow aggregator Album of the Year. John Calvert of Drowned in Sound awarded the record an unprecedented 0/10 and described it as "the un-music"; Neil Kulkarni in The Quietus agreed that the album is not "actually music" and is akin to "shite, in the noonday sun, attracting flies". Both critics wished for no further recordings from the band.
Nine Track Mind, Charlie Puth (2016)
Doreen St. Félix in The New Yorker wrote, "Full of bland doo-wop ballads, Nine Track Mind was, according to Metacritic, one of the worst-reviewed albums of all time. Puth seemed a genuine talent strained by nostalgia-baiting and the exigencies of social media." Pitchfork's Jia Tolentino wrote, "Puth cannot fill this frame of sentimentality with any genuine sentiment: The album's emotional range covers the spectrum from light longing to light infatuation, contributing to the overall sense that 'Nine Track Mind' is aimed exclusively at hairlessness: children, prepubescents, the discomfitingly waxed."
Father of All Motherfuckers, Green Day (2020)
Loudwire reported that the album was the worst-reviewed rock album of the 21st century, based on a study of the harshness of language in negative and mixed critical reviews as well as listener reception.
143, Katy Perry (2024)
Described as "uninspired" by the Associated Press, Mikael Wood for the Los Angeles Times wrote that Perry's seventh studio album "[is] bad, and not even in a fun way. 143 is an oddly cold dance-pop album with boring melodies, utilitarian grooves and vocal performances that feel vaguely AI-derived." It is currently the worst-reviewed album of 2024 on Metacritic, with an average score of 37.
Starface, Tyga (2026)
Starface was a critical and commercial failure, attracting negative critic reviews due to its use of artificial intelligence in production. Pitchfork described the album as "slop-pop" and gave it a score of 0.0, the lowest rating given by the website in 19 years. Drew Millard, writing for the magazine, called the album a "piece of shit" and opined that "its very existence has made the world a worse place". Sputnikmusic called it "an insult to music as an art form" and "quite literally one of the worst albums to ever exist".

== Songs ==
The following songs have been named by critics, broadcasters, composers, and listeners as the "worst ever". Examples of sources include VH1's "50 Most Awesomely Bad Songs Ever" and Blender's "Run for Your Life! It's the 50 Worst Songs Ever!".

=== 1950s–1960s ===
"Yes, Sir, That's My Baby", Harry Kari and His Six Saki Sippers (1953)
The mock-Japanese novelty record (a cover of a 1925 hit) was one of many released by dialect comic Harry Stewart under an alias (most of his others were under the name Yogi Yorgesson). While Stewart's records routinely got bad reviews in the press, a brief but particularly scathing review in Billboard may have earned the record enough publicity to chart on the magazine's own charts and prompted radio stations to play it. One radio disc jockey disparaged the record on-air as "the worst record (he had) ever heard" when playing it, and the record's poor quality inspired those in the music industry to record intentionally bad songs in the belief that they could become hits, such as "There's a New Sound".
"!aaaH-aH ,yawA eM ekaT oT gnimoC er'yehT", Napoleon XIV (1966)
The B-side of "They're Coming to Take Me Away, Ha-Haaa!," a novelty hit for Jerry Samuels as Napoleon XIV, consists solely of the A-side played in reverse. In Dave Marsh's 1981 book The Book of Rock Lists, Marsh describes the song as the most obnoxious song to have ever been placed in a jukebox, stating that it once caused a diner with 40 customers to be evacuated in the time it took to play the record in its entirety.
"Paralyzed", Legendary Stardust Cowboy (1968)
This record features T Bone Burnett (a guitarist) on drums and consists of one-chord strums, mostly unintelligible screaming, and an abrupt bugle solo. It was identified in the 1994 book The New Book of Rock Lists as the worst song ever released by a major label. Rhino Records also included it on The World's Worst Records.
"MacArthur Park", Richard Harris (1968)
In 1992, Miami Herald journalist Dave Barry conducted a poll among his readers, who selected the Harris original as the worst track ever recorded, both in terms of "Worst Lyrics" (written, along with melody, by Jimmy Webb) and "Worst Overall Song". This is despite the fact that it topped the music charts in Europe and Australia, won the 1969 Grammy Award for Best Arrangement Accompanying Vocalists, and would again become a number-one hit during the disco era in the form of a 1978 cover by Donna Summer; it would also be spoofed by Weird Al Yankovic in 1993 as "Jurassic Park"; and also became a modest hit for country music singer Waylon Jennings (accompanied by The Kimberlys) in 1969, was nominated for Grammy Award for Best Country Performance by a Duo or Group with Vocal at the 12th Annual Grammy Awards and was re-recorded for his 1976 album Are You Ready for the Country (as "MacArthur Park (Revisited)").
"Ob-La-Di, Ob-La-Da", the Beatles (1968)
This Paul McCartney composition was loathed by bandmates John Lennon and George Harrison, and was voted the worst track ever recorded in a listener poll organized by Mars Inc. It was also ranked No. 48 on Blender magazine's "50 Worst Songs Ever".

=== 1970s–1980s ===
"Seasons in the Sun", Terry Jacks (1973)
This cover version of a 1961 song by Belgian singer Jacques Brel ranked number five in a CNN poll of the worst songs of all time in 2006.
"(You're) Having My Baby", Paul Anka (1974)
The No. 1 worst song as voted by CNN.com users in 2006, the song was criticized for its perceived patronizing take on pregnancy from the expecting father's point of view.
"I've Never Been to Me", Charlene (1977)
This song was listed as the No. 3 worst song of all time in Jimmy Guterman's 1991 book The Worst Rock n' Roll Records of All Time: A Fan's Guide to the Stuff You Love to Hate. It also ranked number four in a CNN poll of the worst songs of all time in 2006.
"Dance with Me", Reginald Bosanquet (1980)
A disco song with lyrics narrated in the style of a British newscast by a former ITN news anchor, it was voted number one in the "Bottom 30" by listeners of British DJ Kenny Everett in 1980.
"The Birdie Song", the Tweets (1981)
A straight rendition of the "Chicken Dance" by Werner Thomas, "The Birdie Song" was voted the most annoying track of all time in a 2000 Dotmusic poll. The Clash guitarist Mick Jones also named it the worst song ever written (along with "Billy Don't Be a Hero" by Paper Lace), as did Simon Burnton in The Guardian.
"Ebony and Ivory", Paul McCartney featuring Stevie Wonder (1982)
This duet used the materials that constitute the black and white keys on a piano as a metaphor for racial harmony. It ranked number one in a BBC 6 Music poll of the worst duets in history and number 10 in Blender's poll of worst songs ever, and has been described as "saccharine" for its heavy-handed approach to its subject.
"True", Spandau Ballet (1983)
"True" was described as the worst song ever by The Guardian journalist Luke Williams; Williams's colleague Michael Hann described the track as "dreadful wine-bar soul". Seattle Post-Intelligencer critic Robert Jamieson called it the worst love song of all time. The track also appeared in the Houston Press' "10 Songs We Never, Ever Want to Hear Again, Ever" while the line "I bought a ticket to the world but now I've come back again" was included in NME's "50 Worst Pop Lyrics of All Time."
"Agadoo", Black Lace (1984)
The song was voted the worst song of all time by a panel of professional music writers and industry experts published in a 2003 Q poll, which deemed it "magnificently dreadful" and reminiscent of "the school disco you were forced to attend, your middle-aged relatives forming a conga at a wedding party, a travelling DJ act based in Wolverhampton, every party cliche you ever heard." It was banned from being played on BBC Radio 1 for a period because it was not viewed as a "credible" song.
"Illegal Alien", Genesis (1984)
Blender listed "Illegal Alien" as the 13th worst song of all time in 2006. Wired's Scott Thill described the song as "misguided ... confusing (and confused)". Steve Spears of the Tampa Bay Times called the lyrics "ridiculous" and asked if it was "one of the most racist songs of the '80s". For Reader's Digest, Jeremy Helligar included "Illegal Alien" on a list of racist songs and wrote that "the fact that it exists at all proves that undervaluing Mexicans has been an American theme for decades". Shannon Sweet of the San Antonio Current wrote that it "goes full-on racist" and "tackles every Hispanic stereotype that exists", while Ryan Reed of Stereogum called it "face-palm filler" and a "borderline-racist border-crossing sing-along".
"Sussudio", Phil Collins (1985)
Critic Michael Saunders in the Sun-Sentinel named "Sussudio" as the worst song of the rock era, describing it as "insipid" and "indefensibly stupid". Guardian journalist Tom Service wrote: "'Sussudio' brings me out in a cold sweat ... there's no colder or more superficial sound in popular music." Michael Musto in The Village Voice listed it as the second worst song ever and said that it "could have been the theme song for the Third Reich, it was that insidious and evil". Creative Loafing Charlotte writer Matt Brunson called it the worst song of the 1980s. The track has also been criticized for sounding too similar to Prince's "1999"; Mark Caro in the Chicago Tribune labelled it a "ripoff".
"We Built This City", Starship (1985)
This lead single from the band's debut studio album, Knee Deep in the Hoopla, is often cited as the worst song of all time. It was ranked number one on Blender magazine's list of the worst songs of all time (with Craig Marks deeming it "a real reflection of what practically killed rock music in the '80s") and Rolling Stone's list "The 10 Worst Songs of the 1980s". It has also been called the worst song of all time by GQ and The A.V. Club, and named one of the worst songs of all time in a readers' poll in the New York Post. The group's co-lead singer Grace Slick has called it "the worst song ever" and "awful".
"The Lady in Red", Chris de Burgh (1986)
This song was voted the tenth most annoying song of all time in a poll commissioned by Dotmusic in 2000. It was one of only two singles in the top ten that were not novelty songs. It was also voted the third worst song of the 1980s by readers of Rolling Stone. It was chosen as the sixth worst love song of all time by Gigwise, who said "it is destined to grate on you at weddings forever more." In a 2001 poll of more than 50,000 Channel 4 viewers and readers of The Observer, the song was voted the fourth most-hated UK number-one single. Neil Norman of The Independent argued in 2006, "Only James Blunt has managed to come up with a song more irritating than Chris de Burgh's 'Lady in Red'. The 1986 mawkfest – according to De Burgh – has reduced many famous people to tears including Diana, Princess of Wales, Fergie and Mel Smith. The less emotionally impressionable, meanwhile, adopt Oscar Wilde's view on the death of Little Nell – that it would take a heart of stone to listen to 'Lady in Red' and not laugh."
"Don't Worry, Be Happy", Bobby McFerrin (1988)
This song was named by Village Voice critic Michael Musto as the worst of all time and topped Q100 DJ Bert Weiss's list of tracks he would forever ban from radio. In its "50 Worst Songs Ever", Blender said that "it's difficult to think of a song more likely to plunge you into suicidal despondency than this" and lambasted its "appalling" lyrics.
"Kokomo", the Beach Boys (1988)
"Kokomo" appeared on Blender's list of the 50 worst songs and Dallas Observer's list of the ten worst songs by great artists. MEL Magazine named it the worst summer song, and wrote that "a lot of us have taken immense delight in hating this 1988 smash". NME named the "Kokomo" music video one of the worst ever. Tom Breihan of Stereogum wrote that "people hate 'Kokomo' ... [it] has a reputation as a monument to mediocrity. To this day, it serves as a textbook cautionary tale of a once-beloved group poisoning its own legacy and goodwill by making smarmy '80s yuppie pablum."

=== 1990s–2000s ===
"Ice Ice Baby", Vanilla Ice (1990)
Spinner editors ranked this the second-worst track in history, while Blender staff placed it fifth. A Houston Press critic named it as the worst song ever by an artist from Texas, and claimed that it "set back the cause of white people in hip-hop [by] a decade". The song is also infamous for its controversial sampling of "Under Pressure" by Queen and David Bowie, who did not initially receive royalties or songwriting credits.
"Wiggle Wiggle", Bob Dylan (1990)
The opening track from the artist's highly criticised album Under the Red Sky has been singled out by critics as a song that appears on lists for worst songs by great artists, with many noting that it sounds like a nursery rhyme set to rock music. Music journalist Patrick Humphries, who was highly critical of the album, attacked the track in particular, considering it "worse than anything Dylan has ever recorded."
"Achy Breaky Heart", Billy Ray Cyrus (1992)
The song has appeared on multiple "worst songs ever" lists. It was named the worst of all time in The Independent on Saturday, and was ranked second in Blender's "50 Worst Songs Ever". It also placed first in a Sydney Morning Herald reader poll to determine the worst track of the 1990s, and was voted by Chicago Tribune readers as the worst song of 1992.
"Could It Be Magic", Take That (1992)
This cover of the 1971 Barry Manilow track was voted the worst song in history in a 2004 public poll organized by Diesel. NME's Anthony Thornton said of the result, "Thank God that 'Could It Be Magic?' has finally been recognized as the worst song in the world. It is the kind of track that makes you wake up screaming."
"What's Up?", 4 Non Blondes (1993)
Carl Barât of the Libertines and Stuart Braithwaite of Mogwai have both named "What's Up?" the worst song ever. Dean Ween of Ween called it "as bad as music gets. ... Everything about the song is so awful that if I sat down and tried to write the worst song ever, I couldn't even make it 10 percent of the reality of how awful that song is." Tara Dublin in The Huffington Post called it "without question, the worst song of the 1990s".
"Mr Blobby", Mr Blobby (1993)
The self-titled Christmas release credited to the Noel's House Party character is regarded by many as the worst single of all time. It has been ranked near the top of various "worst songs" lists compiled by journalists and polls by the BBC, The Guardian, and Channel 4.
"Cotton Eye Joe", Rednex (1994)
The Eurodance track was ranked number 1 in CBS News's "Top 10 Worst Songs From 'Jock Jams'", which deemed it an "unholy hybrid of country-fried fiddle kitsch and relentless Hi-NRG drum sequencing." Démar Grant of Toronto Star called it the worst song of the 1990s, describing it as "straight drivel with no chaser." Fozzy's Chris Jericho considers it to be his least favorite song (alongside "Mambo No. 5" by Lou Bega and "Scatman (Ski-Ba-Bop-Ba-Dop-Bop)" by Scatman John); he has claimed that "No one has ever waited for or wanted an EDM-hillbilly country mix or mashup." It was also ranked No. 38 on Blender magazine's "50 Worst Songs Ever", and featured in NME's "32 Of The Very Worst UK Number One Singles Of All Time".
"Barbie Girl", Aqua (1997)
The novelty dance track has been included on lists including Rolling Stone's "Worst Songs of the Nineties" (at number one) and in NME's unranked list "32 of the Very Worst UK Number One Singles of All Time". NME named it the Worst Single of 1998.
"Life", Des'ree (1998)
One verse has been voted as having the worst lyrics ever in polls by the BBC, The Independent, and the Herald Sun: "I don't want to see a ghost/It's the sight that I fear most/I'd rather have a piece of toast/Watch the evening news."
"Nookie", Limp Bizkit (1999)
"Nookie" was listed at number 1 in BuzzFeed's list of the 30 worst songs ever written, with Ryan Broderick saying that "it should be against the law to be [Limp Bizkit frontman] Fred Durst."
"American Pie", Madonna (2000)
Madonna's cover of the 1971 Don McLean song, recorded for the soundtrack of her film The Next Best Thing, was ranked third in both a Rolling Stone reader poll and an A.V. Club article ranking the worst cover songs of all-time. It was the only song to appear in the top five on both lists.
"Thong Song", Sisqó (2000)
"Thong Song" placed first in a St. Paul Pioneer Press reader poll to determine the worst song in history. It has also been described as containing "marketable sexism" in Iowa State Daily.
"The Christmas Shoes", NewSong (2000)
The song has appeared on various "worst Christmas song" lists. It was named "The Worst Christmas Song Ever" in 2011 by Gawker following a survey of commenters.
"Who Let the Dogs Out?", Baha Men (2000)
The song ranked atop Spinner's "Top 20 Worst Songs Ever".
"Cheeky Song (Touch My Bum)", the Cheeky Girls (2002)
The song was voted the no. 1 "worst pop record" by Channel 4 viewers in a poll broadcast in January 2004.
"Big Yellow Taxi", Counting Crows featuring Vanessa Carlton (2003)
A cover of the 1970 Joni Mitchell song, "Big Yellow Taxi" was featured in the film Two Weeks Notice. The Village Voice named this cover the worst song of the 2000s. NME also included it on its list of the worst songs of the 2000s and Ultimate Classic Rock highlighted the song in its Terrible Classic Rock Covers series. The Village Voice's scathing review of the cover is archived and displayed on Mitchell's website.
"American Life", Madonna (2003)
Upon release, critics reacted negatively towards this song, with many panning its lyrics and the rap. Blender magazine placed the song on the ninth spot of their ranking of the "50 Worst Songs Ever". The "banal" song earned Madonna a place in GQ India's list of the worst rappers of all time.
"You're Beautiful", James Blunt (2005)
"You're Beautiful" was voted by music fans as the most irritating track ever recorded in a OnePoll survey. Spike writer D. Sussman called it "the worst song in the history of mankind", and Gigwise editors placed it first in "The 20 Worst Love Songs of All Time". It also ranked first in Heavy.com's recounting of the worst tracks of the 2000s. In 2014, Blunt issued a public apology for the record's overexposure, which he blamed on the record company's promotion techniques.
"My Humps", the Black Eyed Peas (2005)
Robert Christgau described "My Humps" as "a Black Eyed Peas sex trifle some consider the worst record of all time". Oakland Tribune music columnist Oliver Wang reported that the track is "considered by most critics as either the worst song of this decade or in all of recorded music history". Writers who have named it as the worst track ever include Nathan Rabin in The A.V. Club, Laura Barton in The Guardian, Joseph Kugelmass in PopMatters and Shaun Bruce in The Stranger; Bruce stated that it "may actually represent the nadir of human achievement". It ranked at first place in a Rolling Stone reader poll of the all-time "20 Most Annoying Songs" and its lyrics were voted the worst in the history of dance music in a Global Gathering survey.
"Rockstar", Nickelback (2006)
The Guardian's Peter Robinson called "Rockstar" "the worst thing of all time." It was listed at number 2 in BuzzFeed's list of the thirty worst songs ever written, with Ryan Broderick opining: "'Rockstar' is the most unequivocally terrible [song] of their catalog. If aliens came to Earth and asked why everyone hates Nickelback so much, this song would be a perfect explanation." A 2008 Popjustice poll voted "Rockstar" as the worst single of the year.
"Fireflies", Owl City (2009)
The debut single was considered the worst song ever by The Joplin Globe journalist Jeremiah Tucker. Consequence's staff ranked the song number 1 in their list of the worst no. 1 pop songs, calling it the "musical equivalent of overloading a diabetic with insulin", as well as panning the song's "childish" lyrics. It was also listed at number 25 on BuzzFeed's list of the thirty worst songs ever written, with Ryan Broderick calling it a "tremendously horrible song."

=== 2010s–2020s ===
"Baby", Justin Bieber featuring Ludacris (2010)
The official music video for "Baby" was the most disliked clip on YouTube until 2018. It was voted the worst song ever in a 2014 Time Out poll.
"Miracles", Insane Clown Posse (2010)
CraveOnline deemed this the worst rap song of all time and the most embarrassing rap moment of all time. The Phoenix deemed it the worst song ever recorded. The lyrics have been called the worst of all time, most notably: "Fucking magnets, how do they work? And I don't wanna talk to a scientist / Y'all motherfuckers lying, and getting me pissed."
"Friday", Rebecca Black (2011)
"Friday" has been widely described as the worst song ever recorded, attracting derision for its lyrical content and heavy use of Auto-Tune. The song became an Internet meme and the subject of multiple parodies and ridicule.
"Swagger Jagger", Cher Lloyd (2011)
Missing Andy singer Alex Greaves named this the worst track ever. The song appeared in NME's unranked list "32 of the Very Worst UK Number One Singles of All Time".
"Hot Problems", Double Take (2012)
ABC News stated that this was the worst song of 2012 and of all time.
"Chinese Food", Alison Gold (2013)
Produced by Patrice Wilson, also responsible for "Friday", "Chinese Food" has been called the worst song of all time by publications including The Huffington Post and Los Angeles Times and the worst song of 2013 by Time. The song and video have been criticized for using racist stereotypes of Chinese people.
"Literally I Can't", Play-N-Skillz, featuring Redfoo, Lil Jon, and Enertia McFly (2014)
Billboard ranked the song first on in its "The 10 Worst Songs of the 2010s (So Far)" list. Music Weekly named it the worst song of 2014. Several media outlets considered it misogynistic.
"Stimulated", Tyga (2015)
Ebony called "Stimulated" "the worst song anyone has ever created", citing the track's lyrics being about rapper Tyga engaging in sex with an underage girl and featuring "the wors[t] lines anyone has ever written." Many publications took issue with the lines "They say she young, I should've waited / She a big girl, dog, when she stimulated" and noted that the track samples the song "Children" by Robert Miles.
"It's Everyday Bro", Jake Paul featuring Team 10 (2017)
Uproxx ranked the song first on its "The Worst Songs of 2017" list. "It's Everyday Bro" was also No. 1 on Consequence Of Sound's "The Absolute Worst Pop Lyrics of 2017" list. The song was criticized for apparently nonsensical lyrics such as "I just dropped some new merch and it's selling like a god church" and "England is my city". It became the fourth-most-disliked YouTube video as well as the second-most-disliked YouTube music video (behind "Baby" by Justin Bieber) of 2017. The song ignited a wave of diss tracks, most notably RiceGum and Alissa Violet's "It's Every Night Sis".
"Facts", Tom MacDonald and Ben Shapiro (2024)
Exclaim! and The Mary Sue called "Facts" the worst song ever. Writing for Exclaim!, Alex Hudson wrote that the song is "a three-minute self-parody that speed-runs through every talking point that anti-woke dogmatists are weirdly obsessed with", while Rachel Ulatowski of The Mary Sue considered its lyrics racist and transphobic. For HotNewHipHop, Alexander Cole wrote that Shapiro's verse was among the worst ever recorded and that he "sounds like an AI version of himself". He likened his delivery to Epic Rap Battles of History.

"We Are Charlie Kirk" (2025)
Harrison Brocklehurst wrote for The Tab that it had "cursed" lyrics and deserved to be mocked, but that it was 'stuck in his head'. Referencing the vocals' loud delivery, he claimed the song was "honestly one of the loudest things ever put to record", continuing, "Can you say put to record actually, when it's clearly been made by AI? Probably not." Kotaku writer Kenneth Shepard criticized it as "one of the most ostentatious, dramatic pieces of 'music' I've ever heard". The Mary Sue's Braden Bjella said it was low quality in both its writing and production, and a writer for Al Bawaba said its lyrics were "uninspired" and its vocals "robotic". Paste listed it as the worst song of 2025, describing it as "a computer guessing what a 'serious' song sounds like after being force-fed a slurry of megachurch anthems, right-wing martyr fantasies, and PragerU comment sections".

== Others ==
In 1953, following the success of Harry Kari's "Yes, Sir...," Tony Burrello and Tom Murray, bitter that their more serious music was struggling to find an audience without success, decided to launch Horrible Records to intentionally record the worst music possible. The label recorded one single, "There's a New Sound" by Burrello, B-sided by "Fish", sung by former silent film actress Leona Anderson.

In 1997, artists Komar and Melamid and composer Dave Soldier released "The Most Unwanted Song," designed after surveying 500 people to determine the most annoying lyrical and musical elements. These elements included bagpipes, cowboy music, an opera singer rapping and a children's choir that urged listeners to go shopping at Walmart. As described by the online service UbuWeb, "The most unwanted music is over 25 minutes long, veers wildly between loud and quiet sections, between fast and slow tempos... with each dichotomy presented in abrupt transition." The conceptual artists also recorded "The Most Wanted Song", a love song designed based on survey results to feature the most popular subject and instrumentation. Both tracks include, as an in-joke, references to philosopher Ludwig Wittgenstein.

Some publications have compiled lists of the "worst" music videos ever. Album cover artwork has also been subject to "all-time worst" lists. Individual tastes can vary widely such that very little consensus can be achieved. For example, the winning song in a CNN email poll received less than five percent of the total votes cast.

== See also ==
- Cult following – Group of fans who are highly dedicated to a specific area of culture
- List of classical music concerts with an unruly audience response
- List of controversial album art
- Outsider music – Music genre
- The Rhino Brothers Present the World's Worst Records
