= Chinese food (disambiguation) =

Chinese food refers to Chinese cuisine or food.

Chinese food may also refer to:

- American Chinese cuisine, often referred to as "Chinese food" in American English
- British Chinese cuisine
- Canadian Chinese cuisine
- Australian Chinese cuisine
- New Zealand Chinese cuisine
- "Chinese Food" (song), a 2013 viral song by singer Alison Gold
- China Foods Limited, or China Foods, formerly COFCO International Limited, company engaged in food processing and food trading
- Chinese food therapy (or shíliáo), practice in the belief of healing through the use of natural foods instead of, or in addition to, medication

== See also ==
- Chinese food box, or Chinese takeout container, an alternative name for Oyster pail
- Chinese food syndrome, or Chinese restaurant syndrome (CRS) commonly associated to monosodium glutamate (MSG)
- Chinese Food in Minutes, a British TV series, based upon Ching He Huang's cookbook of the same name
- Chinese Food Made Easy, a British cooking television series by Ching He Huang
