= BLR =

BLR may refer to:

- Base Lending Rate, in banking
- Bad Lip Reading, a YouTube comedy channel
- Bala Lake Railway, in North Wales
- Belarus, whose ISO 3166-1 alpha-3 code is BLR
- BLR, IATA code for Kempegowda International Airport in Bengaluru, India
  - Former IATA code for HAL Airport, the previous primary airport of Bengaluru
- Beta-lactam Ring Records, an independent record label
- The Biggest Little Railway in the World, a 2017 temporary model railway in the Scottish Highlands
- Blacklands Railroad, based in Texas
- blr, ISO 639-3 code for the Blang language of Burma and China
- Breech-loading rifle
- Browning BLR, a hunting rifle
- Blacklight: Retribution, a first-person shooter game

== See also ==
- BLRC (disambiguation)
- Burkitt lymphoma receptor 1 (BLR1), also known as CXCR5
