= There's a New Sound =

Single by Tony Burrello
- B-side: "Fish"
- Released: 1953
- Genre: Novelty
- Length: 2:30
- Label: Horrible
- Songwriters: Tony Burrello, Tom Murray

B-side
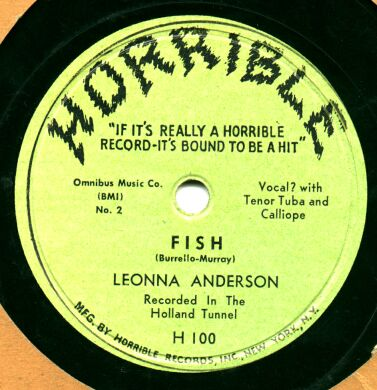
- Original release, Horrible, H 100

"There's a New Sound" is a 1953 novelty song by Tony Burrello, written by Burrello and Tom Murray.

Burrello, a songwriter and jazz pianist better known as Tony Tamburello, and Murray started writing novelty songs after they were unsuccessful in having their more serious material recorded by prominent musicians. They noted the success of music that was seemingly intentionally bad, after hearing a disc jockey play Harry Stewart's version of "Yes Sir, That's My Baby" sung in a faux-Japanese accent. According to Murray, the disc jockey said that the record was a hit but also "one of the most horrible records he had ever heard".

Burrello and Murray responded by creating the songs "There's a New Sound", performed by Burrello, and "Fish", sung by Leona Anderson, which they released as a single. "There's a New Sound" consists of a single verse repeated five times, each time in a higher key, with calliope accompaniment. The lyrics describe "the strangest sound that you have ever heard", which turns out to be "the sound that's made by worms". Burrello was credited as the artist on the single, which was released on Burrello and Murray's own record label, Horrible, as catalog numbers H 100 (ten-inch 78 rpm format) and H 100-X45 (seven-inch 45 rpm format). The single was Horrible's only release.

When Billboard magazine reviewed the single, it commented: "A weird one. 'The new sound is the sound made by worms.' Strange sound effects go with nonsense lyric. It's a studied attempt to be as screwy as possible." For the flip side, "Fish", Billboard′s review was "Same comment".

Burrello and Murray originally had only 500 copies of "There's a New Sound"/"Fish" issued to be sent to disc jockeys. However, within two weeks, they received orders for more than 100,000 copies of the single.

Soon afterward, Burrello and Murray were called upon to write a song for Brucie Weil, who was then 6 years old. The song they wrote for Weil, "God Bless Us All", reached #18 on the Billboard singles chart. Burrello and Murray were soon called upon to write music for other artists, including a theme song for John Conte and special material for Tony Bennett.

Anderson went on to exploit her newfound fame as a "horrible" musician by making appearances on The Ernie Kovacs Show and signing with Columbia Records for two more singles. In 1957, for Unique Records, Anderson released a full-length album, Music to Suffer By, in the same mock-operatic style she used for "Fish."

== In popular culture ==
- "There's a New Sound" was featured often on the Dr. Demento show.
- The song was performed by Scooter in the UK Spot of episode 324 of The Muppet Show.
- Cult film director Dylan Greenberg and long time collaborator Matt Ellin released a mockumentary about the song titled "A documentary about The New Sound (The Sound of Worms) by Tony Burello" on Aug 17, 2025.
