= Ashes (1922 film) =

1922 film

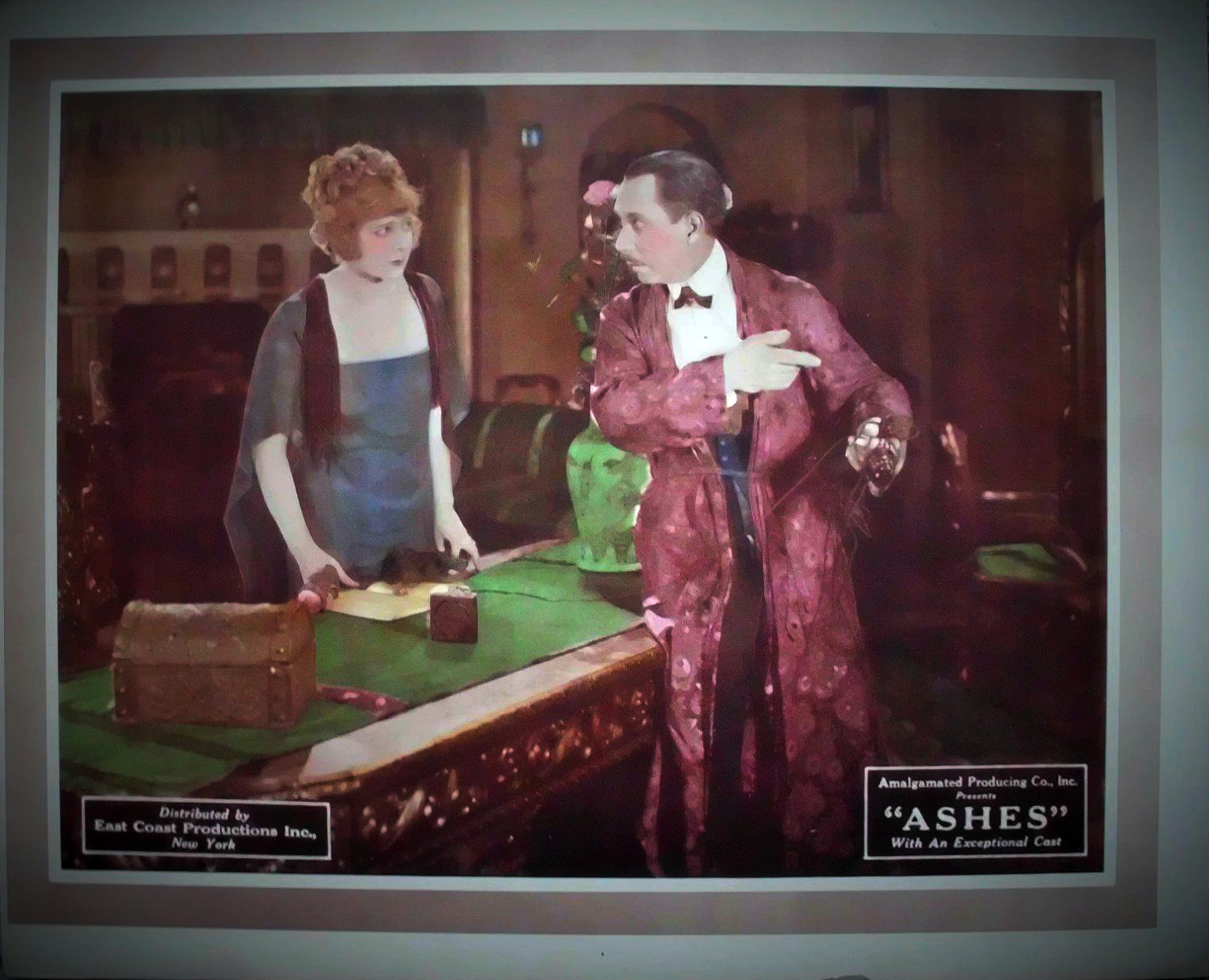
- Directed by: Gilbert M. Anderson
- Written by: Charles Munson
- Starring: William Courtleigh; Leona Anderson; Margaret Landis
- Cinematography: Arthur Reeves
- Production company: Amalgamated Producing Corporation
- Distributed by: East Coast Productions
- Release date: February 24, 1922
- Running time: 50 minutes
- Country: United States
- Languages: Silent; English intertitles

Ashes is a 1922 American silent drama film directed by Gilbert M. Anderson and starring William Courtleigh, Leona Anderson and Margaret Landis.

== Cast ==
- William Courtleigh as Mr. DeCourcey
- Leona Anderson as Mrs. DeCourcey
- Margaret Landis as Madeline DeCourcey
- Myrtle Stedman as Mrs. Crafton
- Wedgwood Nowell as Mr. Crafton
- George Howard as Arthur Spencer
- Carrie Clark Ward as Mrs. Van Stuyhl
- Stanton Heck as Hotel Detective

== Preservation ==
Ashes is currently presumed lost. In February of 2021, the film was cited by the National Film Preservation Board on their Lost U.S. Silent Feature Films list.

== Bibliography ==
- Connelly, Robert B. The Silents: Silent Feature Films, 1910-36, Volume 40, Issue 2. December Press, 1998.
- Munden, Kenneth White. The American Film Institute Catalog of Motion Pictures Produced in the United States, Part 1. University of California Press, 1997.
