= Bad Lip Reading =

YouTube comedy channel

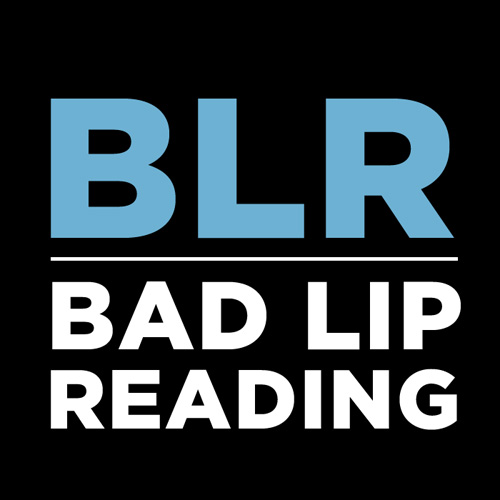

YouTube information
- Channel: BadLipReading
- Years active: 2011–present
- Genre: Comedy
- Subscribers: 8.13 million
- Views: 1.51 billion
- Last updated: March 14, 2025

Bad Lip Reading is a YouTube channel created and run by an anonymous producer who intentionally lip-reads video clips poorly, for comedic effect. Rolling Stone described the channel as "the breakout hit" of the 2012 United States presidential election. As of March 2025, the channel had amassed 8.13 million subscribers and over one-and-a-half billion video views. Some of the channel's original songs are available on Spotify and Apple Music.

== Content ==
In non-musical contexts, Bad Lip Reading involves taking scenes from movies, television shows, or real-life events such as sports or political gatherings, replacing all the audio with foley sound work and then dubbing over the clip with invented dialogue that is crafted exclusively to match the speakers' mouth movements, with no regard for accuracy or sensibility.

The channel occasionally produces lip-readings of music videos, which have a different execution. Rather than using foley sound or recreating the original music, a new song is made based on the original BPM and vocal scansion as its source material, though the melody varies note-wise, and the video may be sped up or slowed down in places to alter the pacing. Again, the lyrics are written nonsensically based on how the singer's mouth moves.

== History ==
The "Bad Lip Reader" behind the channel is an anonymous music and video producer from Texas. The first Bad Lip Reading video released was a spoof of Rebecca Black's song "Friday", titled "Gang Fight". New music and lyrics were matched to Black's video to make it appear as though she were singing about gang warfare. The "Gang Fight" YouTube video, released in March 2011, earned BLR a million hits and thousands of subscribers.

More spoof videos followed, including interpretations of The Black Eyed Peas' "Boom Boom Pow" (a viral video called "Everybody Poops"); Taylor Swift's "Our Song" ("(Rockin') All Nite Long"); and Michael Bublé's "Haven't Met You Yet". The latter was transformed into the "electronica-inspired" "Russian Unicorn", which Bublé himself praised as his "new favorite song" and "one of the coolest things I've ever seen".

In September 2011, BLR branched out from pop singers to politicians with a "bad lip-reading" of Texas governor and US presidential hopeful Rick Perry. After airing on The Ellen DeGeneres Show, the video was featured by news and media outlets across the United States, leading to a sudden surge in Bad Lip Reading's popularity. Following the Perry spoof, BLR released bad lip-readings of President Obama, Republican presidential candidates Michele Bachmann, Mitt Romney, Herman Cain, Ron Paul, Newt Gingrich, and Rick Santorum.

In November 2012 the channel began overdubbing popular movie and television shows. BLR's version of Twilight quickly went viral, followed by parodies of The Hunger Games; The Walking Dead; and Game of Thrones (such as their song "Carl Poppa".) Videos have been well-received not only by the public, but also by the cast and creators of the properties being spoofed. In her online blog, Elizabeth Banks—Jennifer Lawrence's co-star in The Hunger Games—said, "Bad Lip Reading is awesome. I was introduced to it by none other than Jennifer Lawrence. Yup — she saw this, people. And she laughed. And so did I. A lot." Lawrence's co-star Josh Hutcherson also praised the video, tweeting it to his fans.

In January 2013 BLR released a bad lip reading of National Football League players, coaches, and referees, which became the channel's most popular video. A second NFL video followed in 2014, and a third was released in 2015. The NFL Bad Lip Reading video became an annual event for the channel, with each video being released shortly before the Super Bowl.

In a Rolling Stone interview, the producer behind the Bad Lip Reading videos said that he first encountered the technique of lip reading when his mother, then in her 40s, lost her hearing due to unknown causes. While she excelled at lip reading, he was unable to pick up the skill despite trying: "I was terrible at it."

In 2013, Bad Lip Reading won the Webby Awards' People's Voice Award for "Comedy: Long Form or Series". In April 2014, BLR won the American Comedy Award for Best Viral Video for its "NFL: A Bad Lip Reading" video. Patrick Stewart accepted the award on BLR's behalf during the televised ceremony on NBC.

On June 8, 2014, the BLR Facebook page announced the release of the full version of "Modify" by Kniles, a song that has been used in multiple BLR productions. The fact that this song was used without previous attribution, as well as stylistic similarities to other BLR-produced songs, have prompted speculation that Kniles is another pseudonym for the individual behind Bad Lip Reading.

In December 2015, Bad Lip Reading simultaneously released three new videos, one for each of the three films in the original Star Wars trilogy. These videos used guest voices for the first time, featuring Jack Black as Darth Vader, Maya Rudolph as Princess Leia, and Bill Hader in multiple roles, including Boba Fett and Jabba the Hutt. The Empire Strikes Back BLR video featured a scene of Yoda singing to Luke Skywalker about an unfortunate encounter with a seagull on the beach. BLR later expanded this scene into a full-length stand-alone song called "Seagulls! (Stop It Now)", which was released in November 2016 (eventually hitting #1 on the Billboard Comedy Digital Tracks chart.) As of December 2018, the video for "Seagulls! (Stop It Now)" is Bad Lip Reading's most viewed YouTube upload and most popular musical production. In the song, Yoda sings to Luke Skywalker about the dangers posed by vicious seagulls if one dares to go to the beach. Mark Hamill, who played Luke Skywalker in the Star Wars films, publicly praised "Seagulls!" (and Bad Lip Reading in general) while speaking at Star Wars Celebration in 2017: "I love them, and I showed Carrie [Fisher] the Yoda one... we were dying. I showed it to her in her trailer. She loved it. I retweeted it... and [BLR] contacted me and said ‘Do you want to do Bad Lip Reading?’ And I said, ‘I'd love to...’”. Hamill and Bad Lip Reading collaborated on Bad Lip Reading's version of The Force Awakens, with Hamill providing the voice of Han Solo. As of July 16, 2020, the video has more than 111 million views.

The Star Wars Trilogy Bad Lip Reading videos led to a second musical number, "Bushes of Love", which featured Ben Kenobi singing to Luke Skywalker about the perils of love. The song hit #2 on the Billboard Comedy Digital Tracks chart. Hamilton creator and star Lin-Manuel Miranda described the song as "THE summer jam of 2017".

A Bad Lip Reading of the Disney Channel original movie High School Musical premiered as a half-hour special on July 11, 2016, on Disney XD. Similarly, a half-hour Bad Lip Reading version of Descendants aired on November 18, 2017.

In January 2017, BLR released a Bad Lip Reading of Donald Trump's inauguration, which quickly went viral, amassing over 36 million views in 2017 alone. YouTube ranked the video at #7 on its list of the Top Ten Trending Videos of 2017.

In May 2018, BLR released "Royal Wedding", a Bad Lip Reading of the wedding of Prince Harry and Meghan Markle. The video quickly went viral, amassing millions of hits. When YouTube revealed the top trending videos of 2018, "Royal Wedding" ranked third in the UK, just behind the actual wedding itself.

In March 2019, BLR released "Chocolate Lagoon", a Bad Lip Reading of the live performance of "Shallow" by Bradley Cooper and Lady Gaga at the 91st Academy Awards ceremony. On Christmas Day, 25 December 2019, they released another Star Wars-themed music video, "My Stick", which is a sequel to "Seagulls! (Stop It Now)".

In July 2022, BLR released a five-part interpretation of the musical Hamilton. Re-imagined as "Axe-Assassin Albertson", the project revolves around a post-apocalyptic backstory in which an Artificial Intelligence in the year 2122 attempts to restore the missing soundtrack to Hamilton by analyzing the lips of the performers. In addition to replacing several of the production's musical numbers with original songs featuring nonsensical lyrics, many songs were transformed into spoken word dialogue scenes. Upon its release, Hamilton creator Lin-Manuel Miranda shared the video with his fans: "Thanks @badlipreading. You've made my life." Bad Lip Reading himself tweeted that the project was begun as a way of personally coping with the COVID-19 pandemic. An accompanying 10-song Axe-Assassin Albertson album was released on July 17, 2022, featuring full-length versions of all the songs heard in the video series.

== Copyright issues ==
One of Bad Lip Reading's works, "Dirty Spaceman", a redubbing of "Check It Out" by Will.i.am featuring Nicki Minaj, was taken down due to a claim of copyright infringement. It is unclear whether Universal Music issued a formal DMCA takedown request or YouTube's Content ID Match system detected the work and removed it automatically.

In March 2012, the video "Beard With Glue", a bad lip reading of "You're Beautiful" by James Blunt, was taken down by Warner Music Group on a copyright claim. Unlike "Dirty Spaceman", the claim was soon released, however, and the video was returned in October 2012. "Gang Fight" had been similarly taken down the previous year, in 2011, but returned. UMG has also taken down "(Rockin') All Nite Long", the Taylor Swift spoof that features Wiz Khalifa. BLR's parody of "Hot Problems", "Time to Rock", was also taken down, but later returned.

BLR did a redubbing of "Girls Like You" by Maroon 5 called "Haiku", released on 12 October 2018, but the video was taken down later the same day.

Another bad lip reading of "You Need To Calm Down" by Taylor Swift, "Lushfull", was taken down in June 2019.

== Videos ==
=== Based on songs ===
Artist	Featuring	Original song(s)	Release date(s)	BLR song	Upload date
Rebecca Black		"Friday"	Mar 14, 2011	"Gang Fight"	Mar 21, 2011
Justin Bieber	Rascal Flatts	"That Should Be Me"	Mar 19, 2010	"Asian Baby"	Mar 24, 2011
Black Eyed Peas		"Boom Boom Pow"	Mar 30, 2009	"Everybody Poops"	Mar 29, 2011
Miley Cyrus	Snoop Dogg	"Party in the U.S.A.", "Boom"	Aug 11, 2009; Mar 8, 2011	"Black Umbrella (The Right Stuff)"	Apr 7, 2011
Ludacris	The Bee Gees	"My Chick Bad", "Too Much Heaven"	Feb 23, 2010; Oct 24, 1978	"Magic Man"	Apr 18, 2011
Justin Bieber	Rascal Flatts	"That Should Be Me"	Mar 19, 2010	"Hot Jumping Beans"	May 1, 2011
Taylor Swift	Wiz Khalifa	"Our Song"	Aug 22, 2007	"(Rockin') All Nite Long"	May 29, 2011
Michael Bublé		"Haven't Met You Yet"	Aug 31, 2009	"Russian Unicorn"	Jul 11, 2011
Bruno Mars	Lady Gaga, Jay-Z	"The Lazy Song", "Alejandro", "Empire State of Mind", "Do It Again (Put Ya Hands Up)"	Feb 15, 2011; Apr 20, 2010; Oct 20, 2009; Dec 14, 1999	"Morning Dew"	Aug 8, 2011
Barack Obama		N/A	N/A	"Trick the Bridesmaid"	Sept 19, 2011
will.i.am	Nicki Minaj	"Check It Out"	Sept 3, 2010	"Dirty Spaceman"	Oct 1, 2011
James Blunt		"You're Beautiful"	May 30, 2005	"Beard With Glue"	Oct 28, 2011
Gotye	Kimbra	"Somebody That I Used to Know"	Jul 5, 2011	"Kicked Your Monkey"	May 3, 2012
Double Take		"Hot Problems"	Apr 15, 2012	"Time to Rock"	May 16, 2012
Coldplay		"In My Place", "The Scientist"	Aug 5, 2002; November 11, 2002	"Yeti"	Jul 24, 2012
One Direction		"Gotta Be You"	Nov 11, 2011	"SHADOW PICO Trailer"	Dec 27, 2012
Beyoncé		"The Star-Spangled Banner"	Jan 21, 2013	"La Fway"	Jan 26, 2013
The Walking Dead cast		N/A	N/A	"La Bibbida-Bibbi-Dum (On Broadway)"	May 20, 2013
Carl Grimes		N/A	N/A	"Carl Poppa"	Oct 2, 2014
Obsidiots (Katniss Everdeen & Peeta Mellark)		N/A	N/A	Obsidiots: Live From District 11; Song Title: "Choo Choo Go"	Nov 27, 2014
Obi-Wan Kenobi	Luke Skywalker, R2-D2	N/A	N/A	"Bushes of Love"	Jan 1, 2016
N/A	Luke Skywalker, C-3PO, Chewbacca, R2-D2	N/A	N/A	"Not The Future"	Feb 9, 2016
Lucinda Williams		"Can't Let Go"	1998	"SEAGULLS! (Stop It Now)"	Nov 25, 2016
Luke Skywalker	General Veers, Wedge Antilles, Zev Senesca	N/A	N/A	"Hostiles on the Hill"	Dec 18, 2017
Donald Trump	Melania Trump	N/A	N/A	"Christmas Is Here!"	Dec 27, 2017
Donald Trump		"The Star-Spangled Banner"	Jan 8, 2018	"Trump Anthem"	Jan 9, 2018
Grand Moff Tarkin	Leia Organa, Obi-Wan Kenobi, General Taggi, Admiral Motti, Saw Gerrera, Luke Skywalker	N/A	N/A	"It's Not A Moon"	Mar 12, 2018
Fergie		"The Star-Spangled Banner"	Feb 18, 2018	"Nobody Wants My Bread"	Jul 4, 2018
BTS		"Idol"	Aug 24, 2018	"Sample of My Pasta"	Sept 14, 2018
Maroon 5	Cardi B (single version only)	"Girls Like You"	May 30, 2018	"Haiku"	Oct 12, 2018
Lady Gaga	Bradley Cooper	"Shallow"	Sept 27, 2018	"Chocolate Lagoon"	Mar 19, 2019
Taylor Swift		"You Need To Calm Down"	June 14, 2019	"Lushfull"	June 25, 2019
Yoda	Luke Skywalker	N/A	N/A	"My Stick!"	Dec 25, 2019
BTS		"Make it Right" (The Late Show with Stephen Colbert performance)	August 22, 2020	"Monster Run"	Oct 31, 2020
Dune cast		N/A	N/A	"Heaven Drips"	Nov 26, 2021

=== Songs created by BLR and published under other identities ===
Pseudonym	Song name	BLR video originally featured in	Upload date of the BLR video	Upload date of the full song	Published under
Tourists	"Pockets"	"Soy Pablo"	Sep 13, 2017	Jul 3, 2012^{[3]}	Boxboy Records
Skylons	"Holy Waterloo"	N/A	N/A	Jul 12, 2012^{[4]}	Boxboy Records
Tourists	"Fortunate Ones" (unlisted)	N/A	N/A	Jul 18, 2012^{[5]}	Boxboy Records
Airport	"Partial Arc (One Of These)" (unlisted)	N/A	N/A	Jul 26, 2012^{[6]}	Boxboy Records
Kniles	"Modify"^{[1][2]}	"Medieval Land Fun-Time World"	Oct 16, 2013	Jun 5, 2014	Kniles
Ansen Aldren	"Don't Fight The Warmth"	"The Force Awakens"	Apr 6, 2017	Mar 26, 2017^{[7]}	Partial Arc Music
Glitter Job	"Ice God of Hungary"	"Stranger Things"	Dec 9, 2017	Dec 12, 2017	Glitter Job
Faron North	"Judy Moonlight"^{[1]}	"Interrogating Zuckerberg"	Apr 24, 2018	May 1, 2018	Faron North
Faron North	"Drifted Gray (aka Waterfall Hear My Prayer)"	"NFL 2020"	Feb 5, 2020	Feb 10, 2020	Faron North

^{1} Song also featured in BLR's "Royal Wedding" video (May 22, 2018)

^{2} Song also featured in BLR's "Star Wars" video (Dec 16, 2015)

^{3} Source: Archived YouTube video page (Archive.org)

^{4} Source: Holy Waterloo single (Apple Music)

^{5} Source: Fortunate Ones single (RateYourMusic.com)

^{6} Source: Archived YouTube channel page (Archive.org)

^{7} Source: Don't Fight The Warmth single (Apple Music)

=== Based on movies, TV shows, and plays ===
Film/TV show	Release date	BLR title(s)	Upload date
High School	Jun 1, 2012	A BLR of a scene from "High School"	May 30, 2012
Veep	Apr 22, 2012	Selina Meyer- A BLR Sound Bite from "Veep"	Jun 4, 2012
Jeff, Who Lives at Home	Mar 16, 2012	Jeff, Who Lives at Home	Jul 6, 2012
Twilight	Nov 28, 2008	Edward and Bella	Sept 4, 2012
The Hunger Games	Mar 23, 2012	The Hunger Games	Sept 20, 2012
The Campaign	Aug 10, 2012	Iraqi Gold	Oct 26, 2012
The Twilight Saga: New Moon	Nov 20, 2009	More Twilight	Nov 21, 2012
The Amazing Spider-Man	Jul 3, 2012	Peter and Gwen	Mar 4, 2013
The Walking Dead	Oct 31, 2010	The Walking (And Talking) Dead	May 2, 2013
The Walking Dead	Oct 31, 2010	More Walking (And Talking) Dead: Part 1	Sept 25, 2014
The Walking Dead	Oct 31, 2010	More Walking (And Talking) Dead: Part 2	Oct 10, 2014
Game of Thrones	Apr 17, 2011	Medieval Land Fun-Time World — Extended Trailer	Oct 16, 2013
Game of Thrones	Apr 17, 2011	Bonus and Extended Scenes — Medieval Land Fun-Time World	Oct 22, 2013
The Twilight Saga: Eclipse	Jun 24, 2010	Twilight III	Apr 24, 2014
American Idol	Jun 11, 2002	Sing-Song Contest of America	May 22, 2014
The Hunger Games: Catching Fire	Nov 22, 2013	More Hunger Games	Nov 27, 2014
The Avengers	May 4, 2012	Redneck Avengers: Tulsa Nights	May 23, 2015
Star Wars	May 25, 1977	Star Wars: A Bad Lip Reading	Dec 16, 2015
The Empire Strikes Back	May 21, 1980	The Empire Strikes Back: A Bad Lip Reading	Dec 16, 2015
Return of the Jedi	May 25, 1983	Return of the Jedi: A Bad Lip Reading	Dec 16, 2015
High School Musical	Jan 20, 2006	High School Musical: A Bad Lip Reading	Jul 11, 2016
The Force Awakens	Dec 18, 2015	The Force Awakens: A Bad Lip Reading (Featuring Mark Hamill as Han Solo)	Apr 6, 2017
Narcos	Aug 28, 2015	Soy Pablo Extended Trailer	Sept 13, 2017
Descendants	Jul 31, 2015	Bad Lip Reading Presents: Descendants	Nov 18, 2017
Stranger Things	Jul 15, 2016	Stranger Things: A Bad Lip Reading	Dec 9, 2017
Stranger Things	Jul 15, 2016	More Stranger Things	Nov 28, 2019
Hamilton	Jul 3, 2020	Axe-Assassin Albertson	Jul 23, 2022
It	Sep 8, 2017	Icarus Thicke — Extended Trailer	Nov 26, 2023
The Hunger Games: Mockingjay – Part 1	Nov 21, 2014	Even More Hunger Games	Dec 20, 2023
The Twilight Saga: Breaking Dawn – Part 1	Nov 18, 2011	Even More Twilight	Jan 3, 2024

=== Other videos ===
==== Sports ====
BLR title	Featuring	Upload date
The NFL: A Bad Lip Reading		Jan 15, 2013
More NFL		Jan 24, 2014
NFL 2015	Highlights from the 2014 NFL season	Jan 22, 2015
NFL 2016: Part One	Highlights from the 2015 NFL season	Feb 2, 2016
NFL 2016: Part Two		Feb 5, 2016
NFL 2017	Highlights from the 2016 NFL season	Feb 1, 2017
Mayweather vs. McGregor	Floyd Mayweather, Conor McGregor	Jul 14, 2017
NFL 2018		Feb 3, 2018
The NBA		Jun 11, 2018
MLB: A Bad Lip Reading		Oct 29, 2018
NFL 2019		Feb 1, 2019
NFL 2020		Feb 5, 2020
NFL 2021		Feb 9, 2021
NFL 2022		Feb 18, 2022

==== Politics ====
BLR title	Featuring	Upload date
Rick Perry	Rick Perry	Sept 18, 2011
Michele Bachmann	Michele Bachmann	Oct 3, 2011
Mitt Romney	Mitt Romney	Oct 14, 2011
Herman Cain	Herman Cain	Oct 28, 2011
Ron Paul	Ron Paul	Dec 5, 2011
Rick Santorum	Rick Santorum	Jan 31, 2012
Newt Gingrich	Newt Gingrich	Feb 7, 2012
Joe Biden	Joe Biden	Apr 16, 2012
A Bad Lip Reading of Rick Perry's "Strong" Ad	Rick Perry	May 22, 2012
Bush & Clinton	Bill Clinton, George W. Bush	June 28, 2012
More Mitt	Mitt Romney	Aug 13, 2012
Paul Ryan's Video Diary	Paul Ryan	Oct 2, 2012
Eye of the Sparrow	Mitt Romney, Barack Obama, Jim Lehrer	Oct 9, 2012
2012 Debate Highlights	Barack Obama, Mitt Romney, Joe Biden, Paul Ryan, Martha Raddatz, Bob Schieffer	Nov 6, 2012
Inauguration 2013: A Bad Lip Reading	Barack Obama, John Roberts, Beyoncé	Jan 24, 2013
First Republican Debate Highlights: 2015	Bret Baier, Megyn Kelly, Chris Wallace, Chris Christie, Ted Cruz, Donald Trump, Ben Carson, Mike Huckabee, Jeb Bush, Marco Rubio, John Kasich, Scott Walker, Rand Paul	Aug 19, 2015
First Democratic Debate Highlights: 2015	Anderson Cooper, Bernie Sanders, Martin O'Malley, Hillary Clinton, Jim Webb, Lincoln Chafee	Oct 28, 2015
Ted Cruz	Ted Cruz	Mar 1, 2016
Bernie & Hillary	Bernie Sanders, Hillary Clinton, Wolf Blitzer	Apr 21, 2016
Cruz Talks Trump	Ted Cruz	Jul 25, 2016
Democratic National Convention	Hillary Clinton, Bernie Sanders, Michelle Obama, Bill Clinton, Barack Obama, Chelsea Clinton, Alicia Keys	Aug 19, 2016
Debate Night!	Hillary Clinton, Donald Trump, Lester Holt	Oct 6, 2016
Presidential Poetry Slam	Donald Trump, Hillary Clinton, Anderson Cooper, Martha Raddatz	Oct 21, 2016
Inauguration Day	Donald Trump, Barack Obama, George W. Bush, Mike Pence, Clarence Thomas, John Roberts, Michelle Obama, Melania Trump, Hillary Clinton, Karen Pence	Jan 25, 2017
Interrogating Zuckerberg	Mark Zuckerberg, Bill Nelson, Chuck Grassley, Roy Blunt, Gary Peters, Maria Cantwell, Patrick Leahy, Lindsey Graham, Ted Cruz, Jon Tester, Ben Sasse, Sheldon Whitehouse, John Kennedy, Tom Udall, Dan Sullivan	Apr 24, 2018
Trump-Kim Summit	Donald Trump, Kim Jong-un	Jun 20, 2018
White House Press Briefing	Sarah Huckabee Sanders	Aug 23, 2018
Hillary Stories	Hillary Clinton	Sept 26, 2018
State of the Union	Donald Trump, Nancy Pelosi, Mike Pence, Paul D. Irving, Doug LaMalfa, Brett Kavanaugh, Bernie Sanders, Ed Markey, Melania Trump	Feb 12, 2019
Trump in Asia	Donald Trump, Shinzō Abe, Ivanka Trump, Vladimir Putin, Kim Jong-un, Mohammad bin Salman, Moon Jae-in	Jul 10, 2019
Biden 2020	Joe Biden	Oct 17, 2019
State of the Union 2020	Donald Trump, Nancy Pelosi, Mike Pence, Paul D. Irving, Melania Trump	Feb 27, 2020
Trump Interview	Donald Trump, Jonathan Swan	Aug 14, 2020
Debate Night 2020!	Donald Trump, Joe Biden, Chris Wallace	Oct 23, 2020
Inspirational Holiday Video	Joe Biden	Dec 22, 2022
The House of Representatives		Feb 5, 2023
State of the Union 2023	Joe Biden, Kamala Harris, Kevin McCarthy	May 10, 2023
DeSantis for President	Ron DeSantis	Jul 14, 2023
INAUGURATION 2025	Donald Trump, Joe Biden, JD Vance, Kamala Harris, Barack Obama, Melania Trump, Usha Vance, Barron Trump, George W. Bush, Hillary Clinton, Bill Clinton, Jill Biden, Elon Musk, Carrie Underwood, Christopher Macchio	Jan 30, 2025

==== Other themes ====
BLR title	Featuring	Upload date
2013 Independent Spirit Awards: Best Screenplay Nominees	Bradley Cooper, Jennifer Lawrence, Sam Rockwell, Olga Kurylenko, Paul Dano, Zoe Kazan, Tilda Swinton, Bruce Willis, Edward Norton, Thure Lindhardt, Zachary Booth	Feb 26, 2013
Royal Wedding	Prince Harry, Meghan Markle, Prince William, the Archbishop of Canterbury, Bishop Michael Curry	May 22, 2018
Apple Product Launch	Tim Cook, Craig Federighi	Dec 21, 2018

== See also ==
- List of YouTubers
