= It's Everyday Bro =

2017 single by Jake Paul featuring Team 10

Single by Jake Paul featuring Team 10
- Released: May 30, 2017
- Recorded: 2017
- Length: 3:40
- Label: Team 10; Empire
- Songwriters: Jake Paul; Nick Crompton; Chance Sutton; Ivan Martinez; Emilio Martinez; Tessa Brooks
- Producers: Paul; Diego Farias

Jake Paul singles chronology
"Shakey" (2015)	"It's Everyday Bro" (2017)	"Ohio Fried Chicken" (2017)

Team 10 singles chronology
"It’s Everyday Bro" (2017)	"Randy Savage" (2018)

Music video
- It's Everyday Bro on YouTube

Audio sample
- Jake Paul - It's Everyday Bro (ft. Team 10): file; help

"It's Everyday Bro" is a song by American YouTube personality Jake Paul and his group Team 10, with members Nick Crompton, Chance Sutton, Ivan and Emilio Martinez (Martinez Twins), and Tessa Brooks featuring. It was released on May 30, 2017, along with the music video. The song is a diss track aimed primarily at fellow YouTube personality and Paul's former girlfriend, Alissa Violet, who responded by releasing "It's Every Night Sis" with YouTuber RiceGum.

The song was released to a strongly negative reception, with criticism directed at its lyrics and rapping style. Despite making $2.7 million, as estimated by Polygon, the track is considered by many to be one of the worst songs of all time and to have kickstarted an era in which YouTube feuds were played out through diss tracks.

== Background and production ==
Much of the song is focused on the breakup of Paul and former girlfriend Alissa Violet, as well as Paul's new relationship with influencer Tessa Brooks. The song's release was a short time after Paul had kicked Violet out of the house that Paul and his influencer group Team 10 were living in, as well as Violet's suspicion that Paul was cheating on her with Brooks prior to her removal from the Team 10 house; though Paul also suspected that Violet engaged in cheating against him. Simultaneously, tensions rose between both Paul and his brother Logan as well as between Violet and Brooks.

The breakdown of Paul and Violet's relationship was seen in the lyrics of "This is Team 10 bitch, who the hell are flippin' you? And you know I kick them out if they ain't with the crew. Yeah I'm talking about you", referring directly to Violet.

In addition, Paul mentions surpassing the subscriber count of PewDiePie, then the most-subscribed channel on YouTube and still one of the most-subscribed individuals on the platform, and his Disney Channel show Bizaardvark. Paul claimed in an interview with Billboard that he wrote the song to outline his daily life.

In the description on the YouTube video of the official music video for the song, Paul claimed that he and Team 10 wrote, filmed and edited the song, all within one day, though this has yet to be verified. The song was produced by Paul and the now-late Diego Farias, former lead guitarist of Los Angeles-based progressive metalcore band Volumes.

== Reception and response ==
The song was panned, earning it the rank of 17th-most disliked YouTube video of all time. It was especially ridiculed for distinctive lyrics including "I just dropped some new merch and it's selling like a god church" as well as "England is my city" and "I Usain Bolt and run". The Musical Hype rated the song 1 out of 5 stars and described it as an "atrocious, god awful single". Uproxx ranked the song number one on its "The Worst Songs of 2017" list. Despite the negative reception, the music video accumulated 303 million views on YouTube as of February 9, 2025. This propelled the song to number two on the U.S. iTunes chart, No. 91 on the Billboard Hot 100, and a platinum RIAA certification.

Many of Paul's neighbors became more vocal with their complaints after the publishing of "It's Everyday Bro"; in response, The Walt Disney Company severed all ties with Paul.

=== Resulting feuds ===
The music video ignited a wave of feuds that played out through diss tracks. Among the most notable, on June 6, 2017, YouTuber and amateur rapper RiceGum and Alissa Violet replied with a diss track of their own called "It's Every Night Sis", which debuted at #80 on the Billboard Hot 100 and also earned a platinum RIAA certification.

Logan Paul also released a song titled "Help Me Help You" in partnership with the band Why Don't We prior to the release of "It's Everyday Bro"; when Logan criticized "It's Everyday Bro" in a vlog, Jake released another diss track aimed at Logan and his group of friends titled "Logang Sucks". Logan Paul and Why Don't We subsequently released the first verses of their own diss track titled "The Fall of Jake Paul" though reportedly consulted his parents and Jake prior to releasing it. The initial release ended on a cliffhanger where someone wearing heels stepped out of a car; it was speculated and later confirmed at the full release of the video that Alissa Violet was the person when the second part of "The Fall of Jake Paul" was eventually released after subsequent leaks. The brothers, however, eventually reconciled after the feud, with them releasing two singles "I Love You Bro" and "The Rise of the Pauls".

In its coverage of the feuds, though, Genius raised suspicions on if the affairs and story behind the singles were genuine. Journalist Chris Mench raised the possibility that these singles were made primary to profit off of a smaller skirmish between the Pauls as well as Paul and Violet.

== Remix ==
On November 22, 2017, Paul released a remix of "It's Everyday Bro", featuring American rapper Gucci Mane, in place of Team 10. The remix came to a similarly negative reception (albeit on a smaller scale). It was released with another music video.

== Charts ==
Chart (2017)	Peak position
Canada Hot 100 (Billboard)	56
Scottish Singles Sales (Official Charts)	42
UK Singles Downloads (Official Charts)	58
UK Indie (Official Charts)	25
US Billboard Hot 100	91

== Certifications ==
Region	Certification	Certified units/sales
United States (RIAA)	Platinum	1,000,000^{‡}
^{‡} Sales+streaming figures based on certification alone.

== See also ==
- List of diss tracks § YouTube
- List of viral music videos
