= Eoghan Quigg =

Northern Irish pop singer (born 1992)

- Born: Eoghan Karl Christopher Quigg; 12 July 1992 (age 34); Dungiven, Londonderry, Northern Ireland
- Genre: Pop
- Occupation: Singer
- Years active: 2008–present
- Labels: RCA (2008–2010); Sony BMG (2008–2010)
- Website: Twitter Account

Eoghan Karl Christopher Quigg (/ˈoʊɪn/; born 12 July 1992) is a singer from Northern Ireland, who was a contestant in the fifth series of the music talent contest The X Factor. He finished the series in third place.

As a result of his X Factor success, Quigg was due to be signed by Simon Cowell, X Factor creator/producer and owner and CEO of Syco Records, but was instead signed to RCA after Cowell pulled out. Quigg released an eponymous studio album in 2009, which was critically panned. Quigg competed in the Irish national selection for the chance to represent Ireland in 2014 at the Eurovision Song Contest but finished second.

== Early life ==
Eoghan Karl Christopher Quigg was born on 12 July 1992 and grew up in Dungiven, County Londonderry, Northern Ireland. Singing along to Disney cartoons since the age of two, Quigg found his voice when he was in class and told to stand up and sing as a punishment. To the teacher's surprise he sang well, which led to his becoming a choir boy. From then on he sang lead roles in school musicals, such as Joseph and the Amazing Technicolor Dreamcoat.

== Career ==
=== Singing career ===
==== 2007–2008: The X Factor ====
In 2008, Quigg auditioned for the talent show The X Factor in front of judges Simon Cowell, Dannii Minogue, Louis Walsh and Cheryl Cole. Quigg got past the "judges' houses" stage of the competition, and made it to the live shows in Cowell's 14–24 boys group, along with Scott Bruton and Austin Drage. On the first live show, Quigg sang "Imagine" and was highly praised by the judges. On the second live show (Michael Jackson week) he sang "Ben" which was also praised. On Big Band week Quigg sang "L-O-V-E" and received a standing ovation from the judges and the crowd. After the eliminations of Bruton and Drage in weeks 3 and 4 respectively, Quigg became Cowell's last remaining act in the competition. He made it to the semi-finals and after performances of "Year 3000" and "Does Your Mother Know" was voted through to the final.

Quigg eventually became the last contestant eliminated finishing in third place, with Alexandra Burke the winner, and JLS runners-up.

===== Performances on The X Factor =====
Week	Song choice	Theme	Result
Week 1	"Imagine"	Number One Songs in UK and US	1st
Week 2	"Ben"	Songs by Michael Jackson or the Jackson 5	1st
Week 3	"L-O-V-E"	Big Band	1st
Week 4	"Could It Be Magic"	Disco	1st
Week 5	"Anytime You Need a Friend"	Songs by Mariah Carey	1st
Week 6	"One More Try"	Best of British	2nd
Week 7	"Never Forget"	Songs by Take That	1st
Quarter-final	"Sometimes"	Songs by Britney Spears	3rd
Quarter-final	"We're All in This Together"	American Classics	3rd
Semi-final	"Year 3000"	Mentor's Choice	3rd
Semi-final	"Does Your Mother Know"	Contestant's Choice	3rd
Final	"I Wish It Could Be Christmas Everyday"	Christmas Song	Eliminated
Final	"Picture of You" (with Boyzone)	Celebrity Duet	Eliminated
Final	"We're All in This Together"	Contestant's Favourite	Eliminated

==== 2008–09: Post X Factor ====
Quigg appeared at the Cheerios Childline Concert at the Dublin O_{2} in Dublin on 16 December 2008, among acts including Enrique Iglesias, Anastacia and Irish boy band Boyzone. In December he also appeared on The Late Late Show where it was announced that Boyzone had invited him on their UK and Ireland Better Tour. On 15 January 2009 it was announced that Quigg had landed a record deal with Syco's parent company Sony BMG. He later signed to RCA Records.

==== 2009: Studio album ====
Quigg released his only album, titled Eoghan Quigg, on 6 April 2009. "28,000 Friends", its sole single, peaked at no. 96 in the UK Singles Chart. The album charted at number 14 and spent 3 weeks in the top 100. It debuted at Number 1 on the Irish Albums Chart, and left the charts eight weeks later. The album met with what Matthew McCreary in The Independent described as a critical "savaging". Many reviewers, including Peter Robinson of The Guardian, called it one of the worst records ever made. Criticism was directed at its lack of original material, low production values and poor singing performance from Quigg. Following disappointing album sales, he was dropped by RCA Records.

==== 2014: Eurovision Song Contest ====
In February 2014, Quigg was announced by RTÉ as one of the five acts that would compete to represent Ireland in the Eurovision Song Contest 2014, with the song "The Movie Song". He finished second in the contest.

=== Television ===
Quigg played a minor role in the BBC sitcom Dani's House, playing himself. He appeared as a guest on 22 December 2009 edition of Alan Carr: Chatty Man and featured as a guest on Harry Hill's TV Burp on 19 February 2011.

=== Radio ===
In April 2017, Quigg began presenting on Q Radio Mid Ulster. The following year, he interviewed his fellow 2008 X Factor finalist, Alexandra Burke.

=== Football ===
He began an amateur football career in 2015, signing for Coagh United F.C. He later joined Portstewart F.C. in the Northern Ireland Intermediate League.

== Personal life ==
Quigg lives in Derry with his wife Amy (Nee Campbell), whom he began dating in 2015. They have a daughter, Emmy Belle, who was born in April 2021. Quigg also plays an active part in the lives of Cooper and Milla, Campbell's two children from a previous relationship. In October 2022, the couple announced that they were expecting their second child (and Campbell's fourth overall).

He had a hair transplant in 2020, travelling to Turkey to get the procedure done.

Quigg has maintained his singing career as a member of a wedding band called The Housem8s.

In 2026, Quigg won the Derry Junior Football Championship with his club CLG Doire Trasna.

== Discography ==
=== Albums ===
Title	Details	Chart Position	
Title	Details	UK	IRE
Eoghan Quigg	Released: 6 April 2009; Label: RCA, Sony BMG; Formats: CD, Digital Download	14	1

=== Singles ===
==== As lead artist ====
Year	Title	Peak chart positions		Album
Year	Title	UK	IRE	Album
2009	"28,000 Friends"	96	32	Eoghan Quigg
2014	"The Movie Song"	—	33	Non-album single
"—" denotes a single that did not chart or was not released.

==== As featured artist ====
Year	Title	Peak chart positions		Album
Year	Title	UK	IRE	Album
2008	"Hero" (with The X Factor finalists)	1	1	Charity Single
