= Mud and Sand =

1922 film by Gilbert Pratt

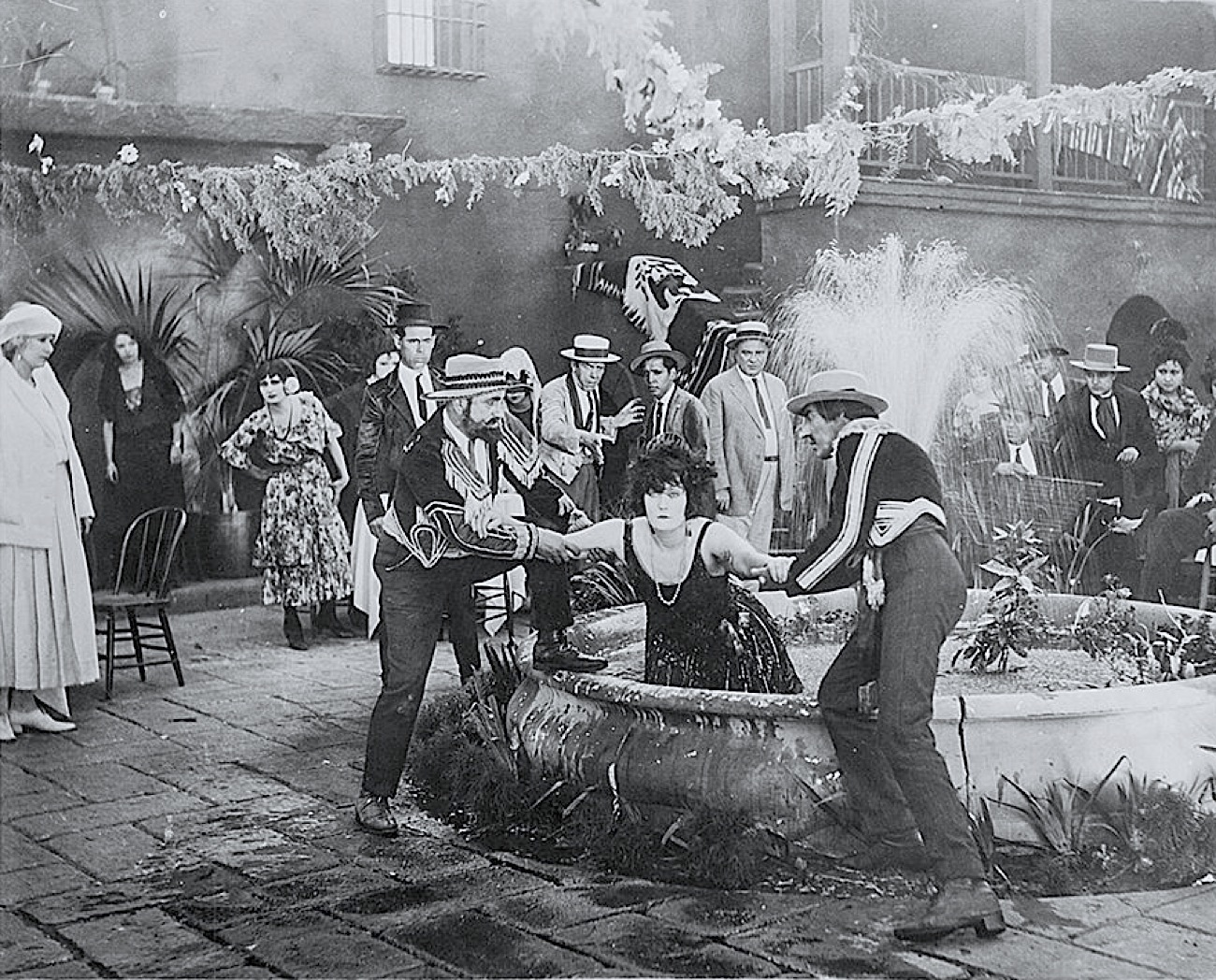
- Publicity photo depicting a scene from the film.
- Directed by: Gilbert Pratt
- Written by: Tom Miranda
- Produced by: Broncho Billy Anderson
- Starring: Stan Laurel; Leona Anderson
- Cinematography: Irving Ries
- Distributed by: Metro Pictures
- Release date: November 13, 1922
- Running time: 26 minutes: 39 minutes (director's cut)
- Country: United States
- Languages: Silent; English intertitles

Clip of the first 8 minutes 28 seconds, direct link.

Mud and Sand is a 1922 silent film starring Stan Laurel. The title spoofs the Rudolph Valentino film Blood and Sand from that same year, and many scenes directly parody the film: Dona Sol is replaced by Filet de Sole, and Carmen is replaced by Caramel.

A poster for this film was later featured in the Buster Keaton film Sherlock Jr. (1924).

== Plot ==
Rhubarb (Stan) has been sent to get flour and his family are moaning about how useless he is now he has his new friend Sapo.

Sapo and Rhubarb laugh as they return, dragging the sack of flour on a rope. They go to the bullring and queue for a job as a matador.

The first volunteer, Don Sox, is taken out on a stretcher. The second volunteer Don Pedro has a similar fate. His friend Don Sapo is next but does no better. Rhubarb announces himself as Don Vaseline and goes in to avenge Sapo. A bull gets thrown over the gate, then another. Rhubarb marks up a score of three in anticipation but on the third he is thrown over the gate. He erases the third score and re-enters.

The third bull comes out on a stretcher and Rhubarb leaves triumphant. The crowd carry him through the streets where he meets an old school friend, sweet little Caramel, with her father. He tells her of his deed. She gives him a rose which has accidentally dipped into black paint.

Rhubarb goes home. As he bends over the goat sees it as too much temptation and butts him. His mother chases him with a broom. His mother cries until she is shown the money he won at the bull fight. He is invited to fight in Madrid.

He serenades Caramel under her window while a dog howls. He is dressed correctly as a matador. He climbs the trellis to her window but it breaks off. His friend who was playing the guitar gives him a stirrup lift and he gets up. Caramel asks if he will drink in Madrid. He answers "anything!". He gives her a jewellery box. It is empty. He finds a second box with a necklace and says they will meet at sunrise to marry. He breaks off the balcony as he drops down.

His "throwing the bull" becomes the sensation of Madrid for two years. Crowds cheer him as he rides a horse through the streets, but when he tries to rear the horse he falls off.

He goes to the Cafe Espagnol to dance. There he meets Filet de Sole, a temptress, and Pavaloosky, a dancer. He accidentally squirts her with a soda syphon, then they dance a tango. Filet de Sole watches his odd dancing style with interest. Two rival matadors sabotage his dance by making him slip. When Filet de Sole starts flirting he drops Pavaloosky in the fountain.

Later that night he goes to Filet de Sole's apartment. Just at the point of their embrace Caramel enters with his mother. Filet de Sole demeans him, calling him "her slave". She laughs at him. He tells Caramel he is innocent and only wanted to see her gowns.

Preparing for a fight against a bull that has killed ten men, Rhubarb gets dressed behind a screen and his assistants give him a large lollipop. He falls out of the window onto the bull as he gets ready. He styles his hair in various ways with vaseline as he makes his final preparations. A lightning storm outside causes a Z-pattern in his parting. He is cheered all the way to the arena. Paying more attention to girls than to where he is going, he falls through the wrong door and a bull escapes into the street, chased by a picador.

In the bull ring, the crowd adores him. He wants to do it his own way.

Filet de Sole is in the crowd, yawning. The very docile bull ignores him. From the crowd de Sole says to the two rival matadors that she must kill him, as he made her take a bath. She gives them a bottle of ether. They soak his cloak (lying at the side) in ether. He picks it up and starts waving it in front of the bull's nose. The bull falls asleep. He is drowsy too, and staggers around. The crowds throw hats in celebration. De Sole throws a brick and kills him ... a line of attendants walk up and pour sand from buckets until he is covered.

The moral of the story, shown after the last scene, is: "If you want to live long — and be happy — cut out the bull!"

== Cast ==
- Stan Laurel as Rhubarb Vaseline
- Mae Laurel as La Paloma aka Pavaloosky
- Julie Leonard as Caramel
- Leona Anderson as Filet de Sole
- Wheeler Dryden as Sapo
- Sam Kaufman as Humador
- May Foster as Rhubarb's mother
