= Eoghan Quigg (album) =

Studio album by Eoghan Quigg
- Released: 3 April 2009
- Recorded: Early 2009
- Genre: Pop
- Length: 42:26
- Label: RCA/SME
- Producer: Nigel Wright

Singles from Eoghan Quigg
- 1. "28,000 Friends" Released: April 2009 (airplay only)

Eoghan Quigg is the only studio album by Northern Irish pop singer Eoghan Quigg, released on 3 April 2009, and his only release by his label RCA Records. Quigg, who finished third in the fifth series of the UK television talent show The X Factor, was the first of the finalists from that series to release a studio album. The record predominantly features cover versions of songs that Quigg performed on The X Factor, and one original song, "28,000 Friends".

On its release, the album was described by multiple critics as the worst ever recorded. Its commercial failure led to Quigg being dropped by RCA Records.

== Background ==
After finishing third in The X Factor in 2008, Quigg was signed by record label RCA Records. Quigg began work on the album in London in early 2009, and was given a week to record it. The album was recorded at Sphere Studios in Battersea and released on 6 April 2009 in the UK. Quigg described the album's musical direction as drawing inspiration from Busted; the album includes a cover of Busted's "Year 3000" and the original song "28,000 Friends" written by Busted member James Bourne.

== Critical reception ==
Professional ratings
Review scores
Source	Rating
AllMusic	1/5 stars
Daily Record	2/5 stars
Digital Spy	1/5 stars
Express	2/5 stars
Music-News	1/5 stars
Orange	1/5 stars
Q	1/5 stars
Star	2/5 stars

Eoghan Quigg was universally panned by music critics. Simon Darnell of MK News wrote: "If I told you this album was dreadful, not only would I be doing a huge disservice to the word dreadful, in fact I'd almost be praising the quality of the music... this set of songs is so mind-numbingly, spirit-crushingly dismal." Jon O'Brien of AllMusic described the album as "bad karaoke", with deficient production values failing to hide Quigg's "limited ability" and "bum notes". Nick Levine of Digital Spy called it "amateurish as well as utterly redundant". In particular, multiple reviewers panned the cover of Take That's "Never Forget"; Levine described the track's vocals as "positively wince-inducing". Gigwise placed the record at number one in their "The 20 Worst Albums of 2009" in December of that year.

The album has been called the worst ever made. A Popjustice reviewer predicted that it would garner a lasting legacy as such, having been "recorded so cheaply and with such little regard for the art of pop that the final product simply does not count as music." Peter Robinson of The Guardian called it "the worst album in the history of recorded sound" and an "album so bad that it would count as a new low for popular culture were it possible to class as either culture... or popular".

== Commercial performance ==
The album was initially a commercial success in Ireland where it debuted at No. 1 on the Irish Albums Chart, knocking Lady Gaga's The Fame off the top spot. The album dropped from No. 2 in its second week to No. 20 in its third week and spent a total of eight weeks on the chart, but failed to sell enough for a gold certification, rendering the album a failure. In the UK, the album peaked at No. 14, and exited the top 100 after three weeks. The album had first-week sales of 16,362.

Pointing to the record's lacklustre chart performance in the UK, Gail Walker of the Belfast Telegraph predicted that the public "may have seen the last of Eoghan Quigg". His album was considered a failure, and Quigg was dropped by RCA Records.

== Track listing ==
No.	Title	Writer(s)	Original artist	Length
1.	"28,000 Friends"	James Bourne	Original song	2:59
2.	"We're All in This Together"	Matthew Gerrard / Robbie Nevil	High School Musical cast	3:52
3.	"All About You"	Tom Fletcher	McFly	3:05
4.	"Learn to Fly"	Peter Gordeno / Rick Mitra / Christian Ingebrigtsen / Chris Porter	A1	4:08
5.	"Does Your Mother Know"	Benny Andersson / Björn Ulvaeus	ABBA	3:04
6.	"Home"	Michael Bublé / Alan Chang / Amy Foster-Gillies	Michael Bublé	3:40
7.	"When You Look Me in the Eyes"	Nick Jonas / Joe Jonas / Kevin Jonas / Kevin Jonas Sr. / PJ Bianco / Raymond Boyd	Jonas Brothers	3:53
8.	"Year 3000"	Bourne / Charlie Simpson / Steve Robson / Matt Willis	Busted	3:24
9.	"She's the One"	Karl Wallinger	World Party	4:16
10.	"Ben"	Don Black / Walter Scharf	Michael Jackson	2:32
11.	"Never Forget"	Gary Barlow	Take That	4:11
12.	"Imagine" (iTunes bonus track)	John Lennon	John Lennon	3:22

== Charts ==
Chart (2009)	Peak position	Sales	Certification
UK Albums Chart	14	25,000+	
Irish Albums Chart	1	6,000	
