= 28,000 Friends =

Single by Eoghan Quigg

from the album Eoghan Quigg
- Released: 6 April 2009
- Recorded: 2009
- Genre: Pop rock
- Length: 2:56
- Label: RCA/Sony Music
- Songwriters: James Bourne, Busbee
- Producer: Nigel Wright

Eoghan Quigg singles chronology
"Hero" (2008)	"28,000 Friends" (2009)	"The Movie Song" (2014)

"28,000 Friends" is the debut single by the Northern Irish pop singer Eoghan Quigg released from his only album, Eoghan Quigg. The album was released on 6 April 2009.

== Background information ==
The song was written by James Bourne, a member of Busted, who gave it to Quigg by Bourne when he was impressed after seeing Quigg's performance of "Year 3000" on The X Factor. The lyrics are about accruing so-called "friends" on websites such as YouTube, Facebook, MySpace and AOL Instant Messenger.

== Promotion ==
On 3 April 2009, Quigg performed the song on the breakfast show GMTV. He also performed it on The Late Late Show, On 12 December 2009, he performed the song on the talent show The X Factor. He also released the song in the UK in 2009 and the album on 3 April 2009 in the UK and Ireland.

== Music video ==
The music video for "28,000 Friends" was premiered on Quigg's official Bebo site on 6 March 2009. It takes place mainly in an empty building with Quigg singing on a microphone. Throughout the video many people come into the building. In another scene, Quigg stands in a tracksuit singing directly to the camera.

== Charts and reception ==
On 9 April 2009, the single entered the Irish Singles Chart at 32 and the UK Singles Chart at 96. The BBC's Chart Blog gave the song one star out of five. Music News gave the song two stars out of five. It criticised the lyrical content and the production, saying, "With weak instrumental and percussion, you’d be forgiven in thinking it was recorded on a Fisher-Price product."

Chart (2009)	Peak position
Irish Singles Chart	32
UK Singles Chart	96
