= Patrice Wilson =

Nigerian-American music producer (born 1983)

- Also known as: Pato
- Born: Patrice Iteke Wilson; June 19, 1983 (age 43); Nigeria
- Origin: Los Angeles, California, U.S.
- Genres: Pop; dance; electro; synth-pop
- Occupations: Record producer; songwriter; singer
- Years active: 2007–2016
- Labels: ARK; PMW

Patrice Iteke Wilson (born June 19, 1983), also known by his stage name Pato, is a Nigerian-American former producer, songwriter, and singer. He co-founded the record label ARK Music Factory with Clarence Jey in 2010, which specialized in young-teen pop artists. Wilson is credited with signing American singer Rebecca Black prior to the release of her 2011 debut single "Friday," which peaked at number 58 on the Billboard Hot 100. Wilson and Jey wrote and produced the song, as well as most songs performed by artists signed to the label; ARK shut down in 2012.

Wilson's successor label, Pato Music Worldwide (PMW) signed singer Alison Gold and released her 2013 debut single "Chinese Food," which peaked at number 29 on the chart. They became viral phenomena through their music videos on YouTube. PMW likewise shut down in 2016, and Wilson has since maintained a low profile.

== Early life ==
Patrice Wilson was born in Nigeria, the son of a Nigerian father who worked as a chemical engineer and an English-Irish mother who was a church minister. In Nigeria, he studied at Wilson Prep School (a Christian school established by his mother), Zamani College, and Essence International School. Wilson's musical beginnings were when he sang in his mother's church and helped out with youth programs at school. Later, he attended school in Europe and trained in track and field events. He began touring as a backup singer with Malian-Slovak pop star Ibrahim Maiga. He toured in the Czech Republic, Slovakia, Poland, and other European countries, and speaks fluent Slovak. He also performed on Slovak television and was an aspiring athlete, training under the supervision of a professional Russian coach for a possible qualification representing Nigeria in the track and field event at the Olympics.

Wilson moved to the U.S. in 1999, where he took his flavor of Nigerian music along with the style of music he had performed in Eastern Europe and combined it with elements of hip-hop. He studied at Whitworth University in Spokane, Washington, before moving to Los Angeles in 2007 to join the music business. Under the stage name Pato, he also did modelling for various brands. He worked for a while trying to promote his own musical career before deciding to produce for other potential artists instead. He got married in 2008 to a woman from Spokane who moved with him to California.

== ARK Music Factory ==
In 2010, he co-founded ARK Music Factory in partnership with Clarence Jey, an Australian record producer, songwriter and multi-instrumentalist. He chose the name "Ark" because of his Christian background. Jey left ARK Music Factory in May 2011 with Wilson remaining the CEO of the company. Wilson and Jey co-wrote and produced the song "Friday" performed by Rebecca Black, which became notable for its largely negative reception. Wilson would also perform a guest verse on the song heard near the songs bridge, although this was uncredited. Additionally, he and Jey would write most songs by performed by artists signed to ARK, and Wilson would often star in the music videos.

Following the mostly negative reception from "Friday", many speculated that he may have been exploiting young aspiring singers with wealthy parents. Wilson rebuffed such claims, saying that the label provided a "relatively inexpensive" way of entry into the pop market for artists:

I'm getting a lot of criticism saying I'm exploiting rich kids and their parents, but find me another company that would do all this at a cost this low. I don't promise anyone fame. In fact, if someone approaches me with their only goal to 'get famous,' I tell them they're not in this for the right reasons.

Wilson went public in a promotional interview tape explaining what was behind the company he had founded. He also released two musical responses based on this controversy: "Friday (Rap Remix)" in March 2011 (written and produced by Wilson and Clarence Jey) and "Say What You Wanna Say" (written by Wilson and Kustom) a month later. Both songs addressed and attempted to refute common grievances which arose from "Friday" and his overall public image. Both songs were received poorly.

=== One Week to Hit It Big: Pop Star ===
Wilson appeared in One Week to Hit It Big: Pop Star, the ABC show Good Morning America's (GMA) one-week special feature. After auditions of tens of candidates, the final line-up of candidates were Linnea Sult, Lexi St. George, Madeline Ralston, all 14, and Samantha Ramirez, 12. Wilson chose Lexi St. George for the ABC GMA challenge of trying to make a viral star in one week. She recorded the song "Dancing to the Rhythm", co-written for the show by Wilson and Steve Sulikowski and produced by Wilson. A music video was made in one day and was launched on the GMA program on June 30, 2011.

== Pato Music World / PMW Live ==
PMW Live
- Founded: 2011; 15 years ago
- Defunct: 2016
- Status: Defunct
- Distributor: CDBaby
- Genre: Pop
- Country of origin: United States
- Location: Sherman Oaks

In 2011, he established Pato Music World (PMW), later rebranded as PMW Live. On May 6, 2012, Wilson released an "official sequel" to the infamous Rebecca Black song "Friday". The "sequel" called "Happy" (alternatively "Happy (The Official Sequel to Friday)" or "The H.A.P.P.Y. Song"), that features Lela Brown and focuses on Saturdays, with plenty of remarks to "Friday" and self-deprecating music video to boot. Previously, Wilson had also written a song called "Tuesday" for British journalist Jon Ronson.

=== Other releases ===
"It's Thanksgiving" was released by Nicole Westbrook on November 7, 2012. The song was written and produced by Patrice Wilson and he took part in the music video released online. It was featured live on Thanksgiving Day broadcast on Anderson Live.

Another young artist regularly featured by Wilson was Alison Gold. Wilson later introduced the duo Tweenchronic, which consisted of Gold and another young girl identified as Stacey with their debut single "Skip Rope" in January 2013, which was also received poorly. After a second release "ABCDEFG" as a solo release by Gold, she had her chart success with the release of "Chinese Food" on October 14, 2013. Wilson was accused of cultural insensitivity for, among other things, using Japanese geisha costumes to portray Chinese culture, but he has denied these claims, saying that he had no plans to disrespect anyone. The more controversial Alison Gold release "Shush Up" in 2014 was later taken down from his official channel. Other releases include Abby Victor in "Storybook", Katie Belle in "Born for This", Lexi Sullivan in "Hot Stuff", Ellie Soufi in "Hysterical", Maddie Shy in "Stronger Now" and MS in "Rewind - Replay".
