= It's Every Night Sis =

2017 single by RiceGum featuring Alissa Violet

Single by RiceGum featuring Alissa Violet
- Released: June 9, 2017
- Length: 2:36
- Label: SYFT
- Songwriters: Ali Youssef; Ferucci Michael Paul; Rupp Dillon Keene; Valenzuela Christopher Roen
- Producer: Dream Addix

RiceGum singles chronology
"It's Every Night Sis" (2017)	"God Church" (2017)

Music video
- "It's Every Night Sis" on YouTube

"It's Every Night Sis" is a song by American YouTube personality and rapper RiceGum, featuring fellow American YouTube personality Alissa Violet. It was released on June 9, 2017, in response to the diss track "It's Everyday Bro" by Violet's ex-boyfriend and YouTube personality Jake Paul.

== Background ==
From 2015 to 2017, Alissa Violet was in an on-and-off relationship with Jake Paul. In August 2016, Paul and Violet moved into a house with a group of social media personalities associated with Paul, known as "Team 10". Later in 2017, Violet began claiming that Paul was kicking her out of the house and emotionally abusing her. Paul, on the other hand, accused her of cheating on him.

In May 2017, Jake Paul and Team 10 released their diss track "It's Everyday Bro". Alissa Violet collaborated with RiceGum for an answer song that somewhat parodies the diss, titled "It's Every Night Sis".

== Charts ==
Chart performance for "It's Every Night Sis"
Chart (2017)	Peak position
Canada Hot 100 (Billboard)	55
UK Indie Breakers (Official Charts)	19
UK Streaming (Official Charts)	83
US Billboard Hot 100	80
US Hot R&B/Hip-Hop Songs (Billboard)	34

== Certifications ==
Certifications for "It's Every Night Sis"
Region	Certification	Certified units/sales
United States (RIAA)	Platinum	1,000,000^{‡}
^{‡} Sales+streaming figures based on certification alone.

== See also ==
- List of diss tracks
