= Double Take (group) =

American musical duo

- Origin: San Luis Obispo, California, U.S.
- Genre: Pop
- Years active: 2012
- Past members: Drew Garrett; Lauren Willey

Double Take was a female pop duo consisting of Drew Garrett and Lauren Willey from San Luis Obispo, California. They are best known for their 2012 single "Hot Problems", which they released when they were in high school.

Upon its release, "Hot Problems" and its accompanying music video went viral and became an Internet meme. It garnered a decidedly poor reception from audiences, and media outlets labelled it one of the worst songs of all time. Garrett and Willey expressed they made the song as a joke and for their friends. They would release two more tracks before disbanding.

== "Hot Problems" ==
"Hot Problems"

Single by Double Take
- Released: April 15, 2012
- Genre: Teen pop; dance-pop
- Length: 2:45
- Songwriters: Drew Garrett; Lauren Willey

Double Take singles chronology
"Hot Problems" (2012)	"Like a Princess" (2012)

Music video
- "Hot Problems" on YouTube

Garrett and Willey released the music video for their debut "Hot Problems" on YouTube, on April 15, 2012. At the time of the single's release, both girls were attending San Luis Obispo High School. The video was produced by Connor Abrams and posted onto his Old Bailey Productions channel. Abrams stated he produced the video as a favor for one of his friends' younger siblings. The video quickly went viral, accumulating over one million views within its first three days.

On April 18, the song was released on iTunes. The song was critically panned, with outlets referring to it as the worst song of 2012, if not of all time. Some compared the song to Rebecca Black's "Friday". The song's virality and intensely negative reception led to the duo going on a media tour. In interviews with Kiss 92.5 FM and ABC, Garrett and Willey stated they created the song for entertainment purposes and to show something to their friends, adding that the lyrics were not meant seriously. Garrett explained, "We knew that we couldn't actually sing, so we decided to go for more of a talking singing". Willey stated that the two were "brushing off" the negative reception.

== Later releases and history ==
On May 28, 2012, the pair released their second music video, "Like a Princess". Once again, the song received an extremely negative reception.

Their third single, "The Stalking Song", was released on iTunes and YouTube, but did not receive a music video. On July 12, Double Take released a remix for "The Stalking Song". In an interview with New Times, the duo stated they were unsure about releasing further music.

== See also ==
- List of music considered the worst
