= Ryan Broderick =

American journalist

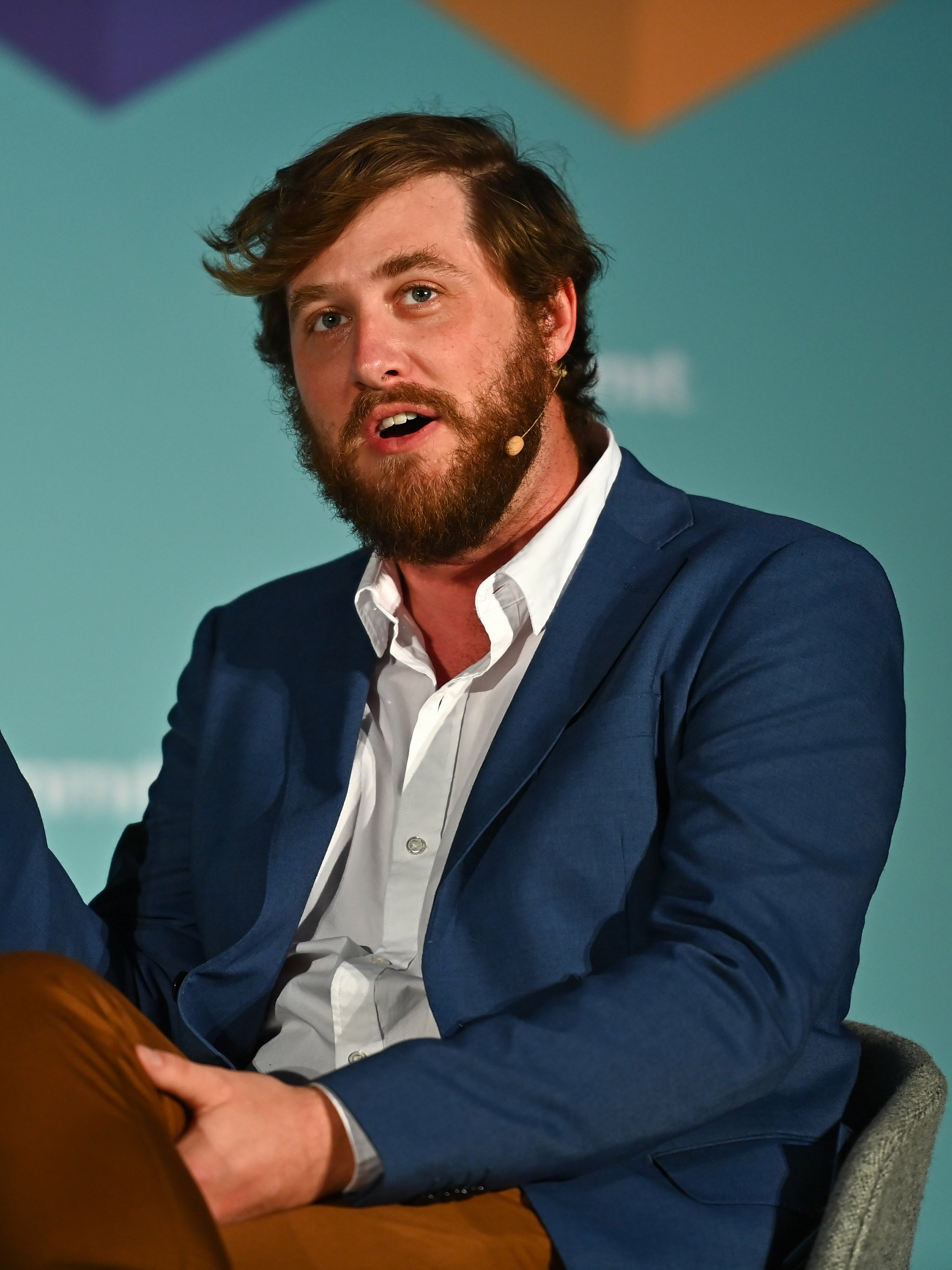
- Broderick in 2022
- Born: Massachusetts, U.S.
- Education: Hofstra University (BA)
- Occupations: Podcaster, journalist

Ryan Broderick is an American journalist. He worked for BuzzFeed from 2012 to 2020, where he was a senior journalist at the tech news desk until he was fired for plagiarism. He has also reported for Vice and Gawker. Broderick has run the newsletter Garbage Day since 2019.

== Career ==
Broderick wrote for The Hofstra Chronicle, where he was editor-in-chief beginning in February 2010. He also drew cartoons for the paper, and dabbled in stand-up comedy. In 2010, he worked for The Awl, where he was an editor.

Following Hofstra, he was hired by BuzzFeed News in 2012 where, prior to becoming a reporter, he was a community moderator. During his tenure, BuzzFeed named him Deputy Global News Director, BuzzFeed News, UK. In 2015, he became a podcaster, launching the Internet Explorer podcast, together with Katie Notopoulos. In 2018, he became a Salzburg Global Seminar guest scholar in a program to tackle fake news. In 2019, BuzzFeed relocated Broderick to New York, back from the London office. From March 2020, Broderick cohosted the Content Mines podcast.

In June 2020, Broderick was fired from BuzzFeed for direct plagiarism in authored articles spanning over the course of his entire employment as a journalist there. BuzzFeed News issued an apology.

== Personal life ==
Broderick is a 2011 Hofstra University graduate of The Lawrence Herbert School of Communication, where he had also sat on the dean's advisory board until his firing from BuzzFeed in 2020 for plagiarism. Broderick was in the band Tallboys. As of 2020 Broderick lives in New York City. He is originally from Massachusetts.
