= Luke Williams (journalist) =

Australian journalist

- Occupations: Journalist, author

Luke Williams is an Australian journalist. He has worked as a reporter for ABC Radio, written for The Sydney Morning Herald, The Guardian, Brisbane Times, Crikey, The Global Mail, The Weekend Australian and Eureka Street. He is the author of The Ice Age, an account of his experiences with addiction to crystal meth.

== Works ==
- Williams, Luke (2016). The Ice Age: A Journey Into Crystal-Meth Addiction. Scribe Publications. ISBN 9781925106848.
- Williams, Luke (2019). Down and Out in Paradise. Melbourne, VIC: Echo. ISBN 9781760685843. OCLC 1104821235.
