= Leona Anderson =

American actress (1885–1973)

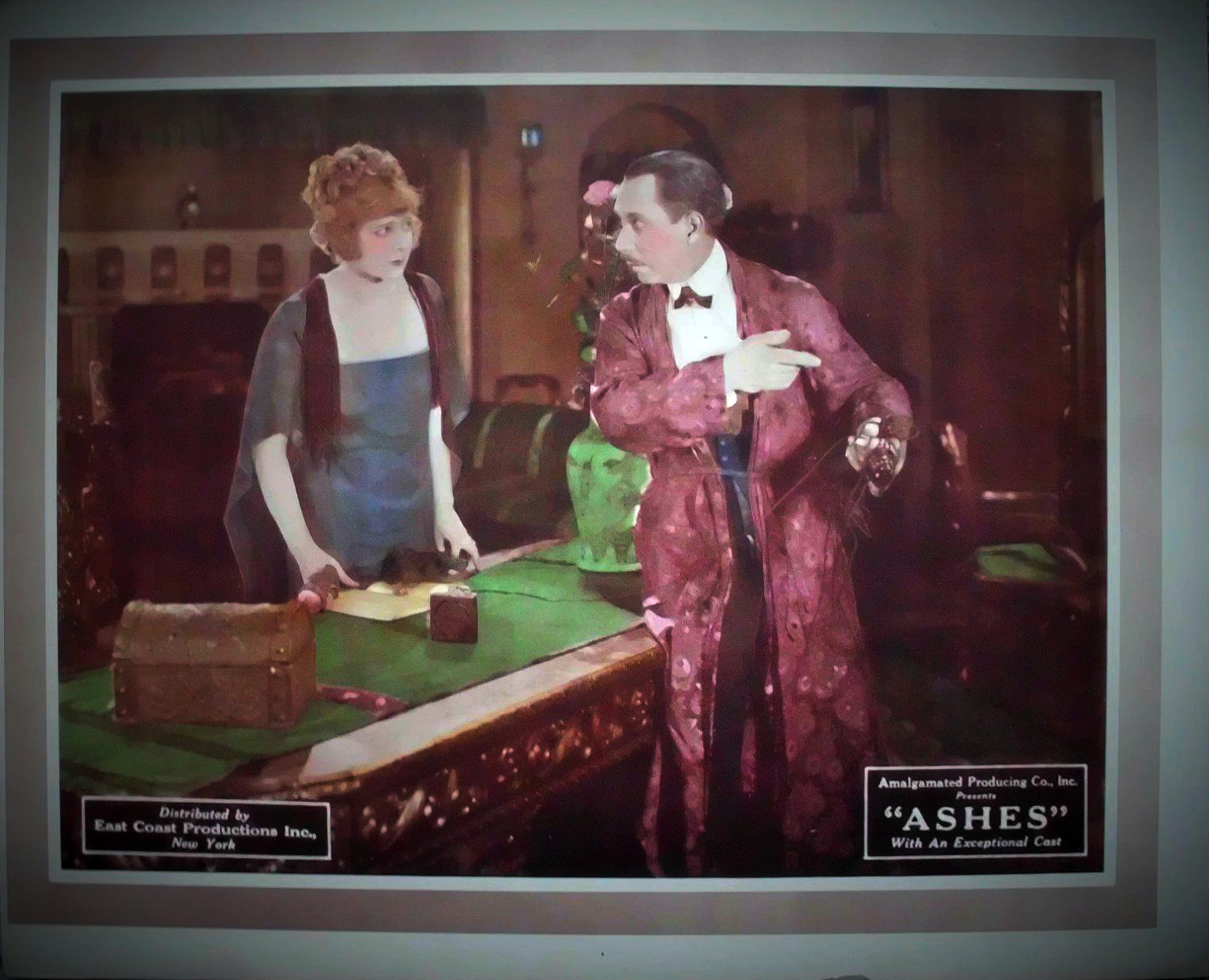
Lobby card from Ashes (1922).

Leona Anderson (born Leona Aronson; April 3, 1885 – December 25, 1973) was an American silent film actress who is possibly best remembered for her 1957 shrill music album Music to Suffer By.

== Biography ==
Leona Anderson was born as Leona Aronson on April 3, 1885, in St. Louis, Missouri, to a Jewish family. She was the younger sister of Broncho Billy Anderson, who co-founded Essanay Studios in Chicago in 1907. She appeared in several films for Essanay Studios without much success beginning in 1914. In 1915, she appeared with Charlie Chaplin in the Essanay Studios comedy In the Park. In 1922, she had a starring role opposite Stan Laurel in the comedy Mud and Sand, a spoof of the Rudolph Valentino film Blood and Sand.

In 1953, Anderson revived her career in music, billing herself as "the world's most horrible singer" and becoming a favorite of comedian Ernie Kovacs and appearing several times on The Ernie Kovacs Show. Kovacs' widow, Edie Adams, later recalled that "She (Anderson) knew she was camp, but she was very funny, and very sweet."

In 1953, Anderson recorded a single, "Fish", for a small New York City record label. The song would later appear on the 1997 CD collection The Ernie Kovacs Record Collection. This led Columbia Records to issue two singles by Anderson in 1954–55. This was followed by the comedic album Music to Suffer By on Unique Records in 1957, later reissued in 2011 on Trunk Records. Music to Suffer By featured Anderson slaughtering several classics and standards, such as Georges Bizet's "Habanera" from Carmen and Cole Porter's "I Love Paris", as well as new material such as "Rats in My Room" (which earned enough notoriety to be covered by Danny Neaverth and Joey Reynolds, and by NRBQ a few years later) and "Limburger Lover". By the late 1950s, she had become widely known for her bad singing, which was apparently an act she created to mock the pompous style of serious opera singers; "Opera singers just can't kid themselves properly ... they can never let their voices go," Anderson was quoted as saying. Music critic Ned Raggett asserts "hearing her crack, strain, burble, and otherwise demonstrate that her singing voice is completely surplus to any requirements might either be seizure-inducing or seizure-removing, depending on how you place your speakers."

Anderson's final film appearance was as the frightening Mrs. Slydes in the 1959 horror film House on Haunted Hill, directed by William Castle and starring Vincent Price. In 1973, at age 88, she died in Fremont, California.

== Partial filmography ==
- The Shanty at Trembling Hill (1915)
- In the Park (1915)
- A Horse of Another Color (1915)
- Her Realization (1915)
- Suppressed Evidence (1915)
- Broncho Billy's Mexican Wife (1915)
- Ashes (1922)
- Mud and Sand (1922)
- Johnny Gunman (1957)
- House on Haunted Hill (1959)
