= BLRC =

BLRC may refer to:

- British League of Racing Cyclists
- Burnaby Lake Rugby Club
- British League Riders' Championship, UK motorcycle speedway championship staged between 1965 and 1994
