= Alison Gold =

American actress and former singer (born 2002)

- Also known as: Allison Gold; Allison Kove; Allison Gregory
- Born: Allison Gorshkov; May 9, 2002 (age 24); Fairfax, Virginia, U.S.
- Genres: Pop; bubblegum pop; dance-pop
- Occupation: Singer, Actor
- Years active: 2011–present (Note: Her time as an actress was from 2011-present, her time as a singer was from 2011-2014)
- Label: PMW Live

YouTube information
- Channel: AllisonGold
- Subscribers: 1.02k
- Last updated: July 30, 2026

Allison Gorshkov (born May 9, 2002), known professionally as Alison Gold, is an American actress and former pop singer. She is best known for her music career in which she released the single "Chinese Food" in 2013 through PMW Live, which peaked at number 29 on the Billboard Hot 100.

== Career ==
Gold was born Allison Gorshkov in Fairfax, Virginia. She adopted the stage name Alison Gold in 2011. In 2012 she began working with producer Patrice Wilson, with whom she had worked on with on all of her songs. Her first single, "Skip Rope", was released as part of the musical duo Tweenchronic, which consisted of Gold and another young girl identified as "Stacey".

Her first single as a solo artist, "Chinese Food", was written by Wilson; Gold stated that she "loved it right away" after Wilson demoed it for her, and recorded it soon after. Wilson performs an uncredited verse on the song, in which he promotes Panda Express. The song was released in 2013 and became a viral hit, charting at number 29 on the Billboard Hot 100 in November 2013 and reaching 14 million YouTube views by March 2014. The video for "Chinese Food" included images of Wilson dancing in a panda costume and dancers flanking Gold in (Japanese) geisha outfits.

Despite its chart and viral success, both the song and music video received an overwhelmingly negative response from critics and audiences; it was mainly criticized for having simplistic portrayals of other cultures, with Billboard deeming it "outright racist" and ranking it second in their 2015 list of "The 10 Worst Songs of the 2010s (So Far)". The video was also the subject of reaction videos by YouTubers including LeafyIsHere and h3h3Productions. The Chicago Reader thought it remarkable that the song's "having bugged millions of people in an interestingly annoying way has earned [it] a spot, however small, in pop's history books." Both Gold and Wilson have discredited the song's accusations of racism, with Gold stating: "I don't really understand what that's all about... I mean, I'm not trying to criticize anyone – I just really love Chinese food!" Wilson removed the video from his channel in 2018, although it was later re-uploaded by others on YouTube.

She later released another single with Wilson titled "ABCDEFG" later in 2013, which did not chart. The song's music video was described by The Telegraph as "weird and creepy" and "slightly chilling", and it was also removed by Wilson in 2018. The music video for her third and final single with Wilson was "Shush Up" in early 2014, which received backlash over the sexualization of Gold, who was eleven years old at the time. Pedestrian described Gold's portrayal in the video as "[aping] tropes of adult sexuality well beyond her years in a variety of outfits and makeup you wouldn’t wish on anyone, let alone a child" and called it highly offensive. The original upload of the video was likewise removed from YouTube, and Gold has not released any new music since.

Alison Gold has since appeared in multiple films such as the 2019 film, The Experience, which was directed by her mother, Katerina Gorshkov, Deadline described it as a "an LGBTQ+ coming-of-age drama".

== Discography ==
Year	Single	Peak positions
Year	Single	US
2013	"Chinese Food"	29
2013	"ABCDEFG"	—
2014	"Shush Up"	—

Other releases

- 2013: "Skip Rope" (credited to Tweenchronic)

== Filmography ==
=== Film ===
Year	Title	Role	Notes	Ref.
2011	Life Fine Tuned	Family friend	Credited as Allison Kove	
2012	Beastly and Me	Mall Kid	Short film Credited as Allison Kove	
2013	Rainy Nights	Allison	Credited as Alison Gorshkov	
2014	Lovesick	School student	Credited as Allison Kove	
2016	The Cheerleader	Daughter	Short film Credited as Allison Gregory	
2016	Rotten	Lisa	Short film Credited as Allison Gregory	
2019	The Experience	Scarlet	Credited as Allison Gregory	
2024	Continental Split	Emily Weddle	Credited as Allison Gold	
2024	Free Spirit	Jules	Short film Credited as Allison Gold	
2024	Days of Eden	Katie	Short film Credited as Allison Gold	

=== Television ===
Year	Title	Role	Notes	Ref(s)
2023	After Divorced, I Took Over the Wealthy Family	Rachel	13 episodes	
2025	XO High	Padma	1 Episode	
