= Chinese Food (song) =

Single by Alison Gold
- Released: October 5, 2013
- Genre: Pop
- Length: 3:20
- Label: PMW Live
- Songwriter: Patrice Wilson
- Producers: Patrice Wilson; Dave Kurtis

Alison Gold singles chronology
"Chinese Food" (2013)	"ABCDEFG" (2013)

Music video
- Archived June 6, 2019, at the Wayback Machine

"Chinese Food" is a song performed by American actress and former pop singer Alison Gold. It was released on October 5, 2013, as her debut single with Patrice Wilson's label PMW Live. Wilson also wrote and produced the record. It entered the Billboard Hot 100 singles chart at number 29, selling 1,000 downloads and being streamed on YouTube five million times for the week ending October 20, 2013. Despite this, it had been reported the same day as not playing on any public radio station in the United States. The accompanying music video was met with controversy regarding cultural insensitivity and has since been deleted from YouTube, although unofficial re-uploads have appeared.

== Background ==
Producer Patrice Wilson wrote the song on his birthday in 2012. Wilson, explaining his inspiration for writing the song, stating: "There's a restaurant I go to, they have chicken wings, they have beef with broccoli, that's what I love. The song is based on my experience—what I know about Chinese food."

== Music video ==
The music video for "Chinese Food" was released on October 14, 2013. It was filmed partly in a Mongolian restaurant, because a Chinese restaurant could not be booked, while some other scenes were shot in Gold's bedroom. It was viewed almost one million times within 24 hours of being uploaded to the video sharing site YouTube, attaining an estimated 4:1 ratio of dislikes to likes and drawing comparisons to another poorly received Patrice Wilson production, "Friday" (2011) by Rebecca Black. Wilson himself appears in the "Chinese Food" video wearing a panda suit.

=== Reception ===
The video attracted controversy for its alleged overuse of Asian stereotypes, including scenes of Japanese geisha imagery in a Chinese-themed song. Another scene singled out by media outlets depicts Gold and Wilson playing the board game Monopoly, after which the camera zooms in on Wilson placing the dog figure on the square for Oriental Avenue. Devon Maloney of Wired wrote that the video "is not racist because it depicts pan-Asian cuisine; it's racist because it lazily traffics in racial stereotypes and paints over the distinctions between vastly different Asian cultures with the same 'it's all Chinese to me!' brush." Gold, in response to the accusations, stated: "I don't really understand what that's all about... I mean, I'm not trying to criticize anyone – I just really love Chinese food!" Wilson also denied any intentions of racism, responding:

Yes, I know geishas are Japanese, but you can find Chinese restaurants in Japan! People say I'm squinting, well okay, I have small eyes. All this controversy, I didn't even think about it. The pissed off people saying I'm racist, the last person who wants to be racist is me.

== Charts ==
Chart (2013)	Peak position
US Billboard Hot 100	29
US Streaming Songs (Billboard)	5
