= Pink Fluffy Unicorns Dancing on Rainbows =

Pink, fluffy unicorns dancing on rainbows! Pink, fluffy unicorns dancing on rainbows! Pink, fluffy unicorns dancing on rainbows! Pink, fluffy unicorns dancing on rainbows! Let's test your knowledge and see what you've learned so far! What color are the unicorns? Pink! Where are they dancing? Rainbows! Please use one word to describe the texture of their magical fur Smiles! Yeah! Pink, fluffy unicorns dancing on rainbows! Pink, fluffy unicorns dancing on rainbows! Pink, fluffy unicorns dancing on rainbows! Pink, fluffy unicorns dancing on rainbows! Pink, fluffy unicorns dancing on rainbows! Pink, fluffy unicorns dancing on rainbows! Pink, fluffy unicorns dancing on rainbows! Pink, fluffy unicorns dancing on, dancing on rainPink, fluffy unicorns dancing on rainbows! Pink, fluffy unicorns dancing on rainbows! Pink, fluffy unicorns dancing on rainbows! Pink, fluffy unicorns dancing on rainbows! Let's test your knowledge and see what you've learned so far! What color are the unicorns? Pink! Where are they dancing? Rainbows! Please use one word to describe the texture of their magical fur Smiles! Yeah! Pink, fluffy unicorns dancing on rainbows! Pink, fluffy unicorns dancing on rainbows! Pink, fluffy unicorns dancing on rainbows! Pink, fluffy unicorns dancing on rainbows! Pink, fluffy unicorns dancing on rainbows! Pink, fluffy unicorns dancing on rainbows! Pink, fluffy unicorns dancing on rainbows! Pink, fluffy unicorns dancing on, dancing on rainPink, fluffy unicorns dancing on rainbows! Pink, fluffy unicorns dancing on rainbows! Pink, fluffy unicorns dancing on rainbows! Pink, fluffy unicorns dancing on rainbows! Let's test your knowledge and see what you've learned so far! What color are the unicorns? Pink! Where are they dancing? Rainbows! Please use one word to describe the texture of their magical fur Smiles! Yeah! Pink, fluffy unicorns dancing on rainbows! Pink, fluffy unicorns dancing on rainbows! Pink, fluffy unicorns dancing on rainbows! Pink, fluffy unicorns dancing on rainbows! Pink, fluffy unicorns dancing on rainbows! Pink, fluffy unicorns dancing on rainbows! Pink, fluffy unicorns dancing on rainbows! Pink, fluffy unicorns dancing on, dancing on rainPink, fluffy unicorns dancing on rainbows! Pink, fluffy unicorns dancing on rainbows! Pink, fluffy unicorns dancing on rainbows! Pink, fluffy unicorns dancing on rainbows! Let's test your knowledge and see what you've learned so far! What color are the unicorns? Pink! Where are they dancing? Rainbows! Please use one word to describe the texture of their magical fur Smiles! Yeah! Pink, fluffy unicorns dancing on rainbows! Pink, fluffy unicorns dancing on rainbows! Pink, fluffy unicorns dancing on rainbows! Pink, fluffy unicorns dancing on rainbows! Pink, fluffy unicorns dancing on rainbows! Pink, fluffy unicorns dancing on rainbows! Pink, fluffy unicorns dancing on rainbows! Pink, fluffy unicorns dancing on, dancing on rainPink, fluffy unicorns dancing on rainbows! Pink, fluffy unicorns dancing on rainbows! Pink, fluffy unicorns dancing on rainbows! Pink, fluffy unicorns dancing on rainbows! Let's test your knowledge and see what you've learned so far! What color are the unicorns? Pink! Where are they dancing? Rainbows! Please use one word to describe the texture of their magical fur Smiles! Yeah! Pink, fluffy unicorns dancing on rainbows! Pink, fluffy unicorns dancing on rainbows! Pink, fluffy unicorns dancing on rainbows! Pink, fluffy unicorns dancing on rainbows! Pink, fluffy unicorns dancing on rainbows! Pink, fluffy unicorns dancing on rainbows! Pink, fluffy unicorns dancing on rainbows! Pink, fluffy unicorns dancing on, dancing on rainPink, fluffy unicorns dancing on rainbows! Pink, fluffy unicorns dancing on rainbows! Pink, fluffy unicorns dancing on rainbows! Pink, fluffy unicorns dancing on rainbows! Let's test your knowledge and see what you've learned so far! What color are the unicorns? Pink! Where are they dancing? Rainbows! Please use one word to describe the texture of their magical fur Smiles! Yeah! Pink, fluffy unicorns dancing on rainbows! Pink, fluffy unicorns dancing on rainbows! Pink, fluffy unicorns dancing on rainbows! Pink, fluffy unicorns dancing on rainbows! Pink, fluffy unicorns dancing on rainbows! Pink, fluffy unicorns dancing on rainbows! Pink, fluffy unicorns dancing on rainbows! Pink, fluffy unicorns dancing on, dancing on rainPink, fluffy unicorns dancing on rainbows! Pink, fluffy unicorns dancing on rainbows! Pink, fluffy unicorns dancing on rainbows! Pink, fluffy unicorns dancing on rainbows! Let's test your knowledge and see what you've learned so far! What color are the unicorns? Pink! Where are they dancing? Rainbows! Please use one word to describe the texture of their magical fur Smiles! Yeah! Pink, fluffy unicorns dancing on rainbows! Pink, fluffy unicorns dancing on rainbows! Pink, fluffy unicorns dancing on rainbows! Pink, fluffy unicorns dancing on rainbows! Pink, fluffy unicorns dancing on rainbows! Pink, fluffy unicorns dancing on rainbows! Pink, fluffy unicorns dancing on rainbows! Pink, fluffy unicorns dancing on, dancing on rainPink, fluffy unicorns dancing on rainbows! Pink, fluffy unicorns dancing on rainbows! Pink, fluffy unicorns dancing on rainbows! Pink, fluffy unicorns dancing on rainbows! Let's test your knowledge and see what you've learned so far! What color are the unicorns? Pink! Where are they dancing? Rainbows! Please use one word to describe the texture of their magical fur Smiles! Yeah! Pink, fluffy unicorns dancing on rainbows! Pink, fluffy unicorns dancing on rainbows! Pink, fluffy unicorns dancing on rainbows! Pink, fluffy unicorns dancing on rainbows! Pink, fluffy unicorns dancing on rainbows! Pink, fluffy unicorns dancing on rainbows! Pink, fluffy unicorns dancing on rainbows! Pink, fluffy unicorns dancing on, dancing on rainPink, fluffy unicorns dancing on rainbows! Pink, fluffy unicorns dancing on rainbows! Pink, fluffy unicorns dancing on rainbows! Pink, fluffy unicorns dancing on rainbows! Let's test your knowledge and see what you've learned so far! What color are the unicorns? Pink! Where are they dancing? Rainbows! Please use one word to describe the texture of their magical fur Smiles! Yeah! Pink, fluffy unicorns dancing on rainbows! Pink, fluffy unicorns dancing on rainbows! Pink, fluffy unicorns dancing on rainbows! Pink, fluffy unicorns dancing on rainbows! Pink, fluffy unicorns dancing on rainbows! Pink, fluffy unicorns dancing on rainbows! Pink, fluffy unicorns dancing on rainbows! Pink, fluffy unicorns dancing on, dancing on rainPink, fluffy unicorns dancing on rainbows! Pink, fluffy unicorns dancing on rainbows! Pink, fluffy unicorns dancing on rainbows! Pink, fluffy unicorns dancing on rainbows! Let's test your knowledge and see what you've learned so far! What color are the unicorns? Pink! Where are they dancing? Rainbows! Please use one word to describe the texture of their magical fur Smiles! Yeah! Pink, fluffy unicorns dancing on rainbows! Pink, fluffy unicorns dancing on rainbows! Pink, fluffy unicorns dancing on rainbows! Pink, fluffy unicorns dancing on rainbows! Pink, fluffy unicorns dancing on rainbows! Pink, fluffy unicorns dancing on rainbows! Pink, fluffy unicorns dancing on rainbows! Pink, fluffy unicorns dancing on, dancing on rainPink, fluffy unicorns dancing on rainbows! Pink, fluffy unicorns dancing on rainbows! Pink, fluffy unicorns dancing on rainbows! Pink, fluffy unicorns dancing on rainbows! Let's test your knowledge and see what you've learned so far! What color are the unicorns? Pink! Where are they dancing? Rainbows! Please use one word to describe the texture of their magical fur Smiles! Yeah! Pink, fluffy unicorns dancing on rainbows! Pink, fluffy unicorns dancing on rainbows! Pink, fluffy unicorns dancing on rainbows! Pink, fluffy unicorns dancing on rainbows! Pink, fluffy unicorns dancing on rainbows! Pink, fluffy unicorns dancing on rainbows! Pink, fluffy unicorns dancing on rainbows! Pink, fluffy unicorns dancing on, dancing on rainPink, fluffy unicorns dancing on rainbows! Pink, fluffy unicorns dancing on rainbows! Pink, fluffy unicorns dancing on rainbows! Pink, fluffy unicorns dancing on rainbows! Let's test your knowledge and see what you've learned so far! What color are the unicorns? Pink! Where are they dancing? Rainbows! Please use one word to describe the texture of their magical fur Smiles! Yeah! Pink, fluffy unicorns dancing on rainbows! Pink, fluffy unicorns dancing on rainbows! Pink, fluffy unicorns dancing on rainbows! Pink, fluffy unicorns dancing on rainbows! Pink, fluffy unicorns dancing on rainbows! Pink, fluffy unicorns dancing on rainbows! Pink, fluffy unicorns dancing on rainbows! Pink, fluffy unicorns dancing on, dancing on rainPink, fluffy unicorns dancing on rainbows! Pink, fluffy unicorns dancing on rainbows! Pink, fluffy unicorns dancing on rainbows! Pink, fluffy unicorns dancing on rainbows! Let's test your knowledge and see what you've learned so far! What color are the unicorns? Pink! Where are they dancing? Rainbows! Please use one word to describe the texture of their magical fur Smiles! Yeah! Pink, fluffy unicorns dancing on rainbows! Pink, fluffy unicorns dancing on rainbows! Pink, fluffy unicorns dancing on rainbows! Pink, fluffy unicorns dancing on rainbows! Pink, fluffy unicorns dancing on rainbows! Pink, fluffy unicorns dancing on rainbows! Pink, fluffy unicorns dancing on rainbows! Pink, fluffy unicorns dancing on, dancing on rainPink, fluffy unicorns dancing on rainbows! Pink, fluffy unicorns dancing on rainbows! Pink, fluffy unicorns dancing on rainbows! Pink, fluffy unicorns dancing on rainbows! Let's test your knowledge and see what you've learned so far! What color are the unicorns? Pink! Where are they dancing? Rainbows! Please use one word to describe the texture of their magical fur Smiles! Yeah! Pink, fluffy unicorns dancing on rainbows! Pink, fluffy unicorns dancing on rainbows! Pink, fluffy unicorns dancing on rainbows! Pink, fluffy unicorns dancing on rainbows! Pink, fluffy unicorns dancing on rainbows! Pink, fluffy unicorns dancing on rainbows! Pink, fluffy unicorns dancing on rainbows! Pink, fluffy unicorns dancing on, dancing on rainPink, fluffy unicorns dancing on rainbows! Pink, fluffy unicorns dancing on rainbows! Pink, fluffy unicorns dancing on rainbows! Pink, fluffy unicorns dancing on rainbows! Let's test your knowledge and see what you've learned so far! What color are the unicorns? Pink! Where are they dancing? Rainbows! Please use one word to describe the texture of their magical fur Smiles! Yeah! Pink, fluffy unicorns dancing on rainbows! Pink, fluffy unicorns dancing on rainbows! Pink, fluffy unicorns dancing on rainbows! Pink, fluffy unicorns dancing on rainbows! Pink, fluffy unicorns dancing on rainbows! Pink, fluffy unicorns dancing on rainbows! Pink, fluffy unicorns dancing on rainbows! Pink, fluffy unicorns dancing on, dancing on rainPink, fluffy unicorns dancing on rainbows! Pink, fluffy unicorns dancing on rainbows! Pink, fluffy unicorns dancing on rainbows! Pink, fluffy unicorns dancing on rainbows! Let's test your knowledge and see what you've learned so far! What color are the unicorns? Pink! Where are they dancing? Rainbows! Please use one word to describe the texture of their magical fur Smiles! Yeah! Pink, fluffy unicorns dancing on rainbows! Pink, fluffy unicorns dancing on rainbows! Pink, fluffy unicorns dancing on rainbows! Pink, fluffy unicorns dancing on rainbows! Pink, fluffy unicorns dancing on rainbows! Pink, fluffy unicorns dancing on rainbows! Pink, fluffy unicorns dancing on rainbows! Pink, fluffy unicorns dancing on, dancing on rainPink, fluffy unicorns dancing on rainbows! Pink, fluffy unicorns dancing on rainbows! Pink, fluffy unicorns dancing on rainbows! Pink, fluffy unicorns dancing on rainbows! Let's test your knowledge and see what you've learned so far! What color are the unicorns? Pink! Where are they dancing? Rainbows! Please use one word to describe the texture of their magical fur Smiles! Yeah! Pink, fluffy unicorns dancing on rainbows! Pink, fluffy unicorns dancing on rainbows! Pink, fluffy unicorns dancing on rainbows! Pink, fluffy unicorns dancing on rainbows! Pink, fluffy unicorns dancing on rainbows! Pink, fluffy unicorns dancing on rainbows! Pink, fluffy unicorns dancing on rainbows! Pink, fluffy unicorns dancing on, dancing on rainPink, fluffy unicorns dancing on rainbows! Pink, fluffy unicorns dancing on rainbows! Pink, fluffy unicorns dancing on rainbows! Pink, fluffy unicorns dancing on rainbows! Let's test your knowledge and see what you've learned so far! What color are the unicorns? Pink! Where are they dancing? Rainbows! Please use one word to describe the texture of their magical fur Smiles! Yeah! Pink, fluffy unicorns dancing on rainbows! Pink, fluffy unicorns dancing on rainbows! Pink, fluffy unicorns dancing on rainbows! Pink, fluffy unicorns dancing on rainbows! Pink, fluffy unicorns dancing on rainbows! Pink, fluffy unicorns dancing on rainbows! Pink, fluffy unicorns dancing on rainbows! Pink, fluffy unicorns dancing on, dancing on rainPink, fluffy unicorns dancing on rainbows! Pink, fluffy unicorns dancing on rainbows! Pink, fluffy unicorns dancing on rainbows! Pink, fluffy unicorns dancing on rainbows! Let's test your knowledge and see what you've learned so far! What color are the unicorns? Pink! Where are they dancing? Rainbows! Please use one word to describe the texture of their magical fur Smiles! Yeah! Pink, fluffy unicorns dancing on rainbows! Pink, fluffy unicorns dancing on rainbows! Pink, fluffy unicorns dancing on rainbows! Pink, fluffy unicorns dancing on rainbows! Pink, fluffy unicorns dancing on rainbows! Pink, fluffy unicorns dancing on rainbows! Pink, fluffy unicorns dancing on rainbows! Pink, fluffy unicorns dancing on, dancing on rainPink, fluffy unicorns dancing on rainbows! Pink, fluffy unicorns dancing on rainbows! Pink, fluffy unicorns dancing on rainbows! Pink, fluffy unicorns dancing on rainbows! Let's test your knowledge and see what you've learned so far! What color are the unicorns? Pink! Where are they dancing? Rainbows! Please use one word to describe the texture of their magical fur Smiles! Yeah! Pink, fluffy unicorns dancing on rainbows! Pink, fluffy unicorns dancing on rainbows! Pink, fluffy unicorns dancing on rainbows! Pink, fluffy unicorns dancing on rainbows! Pink, fluffy unicorns dancing on rainbows! Pink, fluffy unicorns dancing on rainbows! Pink, fluffy unicorns dancing on rainbows! Pink, fluffy unicorns dancing on, dancing on rainPink, fluffy unicorns dancing on rainbows! Pink, fluffy unicorns dancing on rainbows! Pink, fluffy unicorns dancing on rainbows! Pink, fluffy unicorns dancing on rainbows! Let's test your knowledge and see what you've learned so far! What color are the unicorns? Pink! Where are they dancing? Rainbows! Please use one word to describe the texture of their magical fur Smiles! Yeah! Pink, fluffy unicorns dancing on rainbows! Pink, fluffy unicorns dancing on rainbows! Pink, fluffy unicorns dancing on rainbows! Pink, fluffy unicorns dancing on rainbows! Pink, fluffy unicorns dancing on rainbows! Pink, fluffy unicorns dancing on rainbows! Pink, fluffy unicorns dancing on rainbows! Pink, fluffy unicorns dancing on, dancing on rainPink, fluffy unicorns dancing on rainbows! Pink, fluffy unicorns dancing on rainbows! Pink, fluffy unicorns dancing on rainbows! Pink, fluffy unicorns dancing on rainbows! Let's test your knowledge and see what you've learned so far! What color are the unicorns? Pink! Where are they dancing? Rainbows! Please use one word to describe the texture of their magical fur Smiles! Yeah! Pink, fluffy unicorns dancing on rainbows! Pink, fluffy unicorns dancing on rainbows! Pink, fluffy unicorns dancing on rainbows! Pink, fluffy unicorns dancing on rainbows! Pink, fluffy unicorns dancing on rainbows! Pink, fluffy unicorns dancing on rainbows! Pink, fluffy unicorns dancing on rainbows! Pink, fluffy unicorns dancing on, dancing on rainPink, fluffy unicorns dancing on rainbows! Pink, fluffy unicorns dancing on rainbows! Pink, fluffy unicorns dancing on rainbows! Pink, fluffy unicorns dancing on rainbows! Let's test your knowledge and see what you've learned so far! What color are the unicorns? Pink! Where are they dancing? Rainbows! Please use one word to describe the texture of their magical fur Smiles! Yeah! Pink, fluffy unicorns dancing on rainbows! Pink, fluffy unicorns dancing on rainbows! Pink, fluffy unicorns dancing on rainbows! Pink, fluffy unicorns dancing on rainbows! Pink, fluffy unicorns dancing on rainbows! Pink, fluffy unicorns dancing on rainbows! Pink, fluffy unicorns dancing on rainbows! Pink, fluffy unicorns dancing on, dancing on rainPink, fluffy unicorns dancing on rainbows! Pink, fluffy unicorns dancing on rainbows! Pink, fluffy unicorns dancing on rainbows! Pink, fluffy unicorns dancing on rainbows! Let's test your knowledge and see what you've learned so far! What color are the unicorns? Pink! Where are they dancing? Rainbows! Please use one word to describe the texture of their magical fur Smiles! Yeah! Pink, fluffy unicorns dancing on rainbows! Pink, fluffy unicorns dancing on rainbows! Pink, fluffy unicorns dancing on rainbows! Pink, fluffy unicorns dancing on rainbows! Pink, fluffy unicorns dancing on rainbows! Pink, fluffy unicorns dancing on rainbows! Pink, fluffy unicorns dancing on rainbows! Pink, fluffy unicorns dancing on, dancing on rainPink, fluffy unicorns dancing on rainbows! Pink, fluffy unicorns dancing on rainbows! Pink, fluffy unicorns dancing on rainbows! Pink, fluffy unicorns dancing on rainbows! Let's test your knowledge and see what you've learned so far! What color are the unicorns? Pink! Where are they dancing? Rainbows! Please use one word to describe the texture of their magical fur Smiles! Yeah! Pink, fluffy unicorns dancing on rainbows! Pink, fluffy unicorns dancing on rainbows! Pink, fluffy unicorns dancing on rainbows! Pink, fluffy unicorns dancing on rainbows! Pink, fluffy unicorns dancing on rainbows! Pink, fluffy unicorns dancing on rainbows! Pink, fluffy unicorns dancing on rainbows! Pink, fluffy unicorns dancing on, dancing on rainPink, fluffy unicorns dancing on rainbows! Pink, fluffy unicorns dancing on rainbows! Pink, fluffy unicorns dancing on rainbows! Pink, fluffy unicorns dancing on rainbows! Let's test your knowledge and see what you've learned so far! What color are the unicorns? Pink! Where are they dancing? Rainbows! Please use one word to describe the texture of their magical fur Smiles! Yeah! Pink, fluffy unicorns dancing on rainbows! Pink, fluffy unicorns dancing on rainbows! Pink, fluffy unicorns dancing on rainbows! Pink, fluffy unicorns dancing on rainbows! Pink, fluffy unicorns dancing on rainbows! Pink, fluffy unicorns dancing on rainbows! Pink, fluffy unicorns dancing on rainbows! Pink, fluffy unicorns dancing on, dancing on rainPink, fluffy unicorns dancing on rainbows! Pink, fluffy unicorns dancing on rainbows! Pink, fluffy unicorns dancing on rainbows! Pink, fluffy unicorns dancing on rainbows! Let's test your knowledge and see what you've learned so far! What color are the unicorns? Pink! Where are they dancing? Rainbows! Please use one word to describe the texture of their magical fur Smiles! Yeah! Pink, fluffy unicorns dancing on rainbows! Pink, fluffy unicorns dancing on rainbows! Pink, fluffy unicorns dancing on rainbows! Pink, fluffy unicorns dancing on rainbows! Pink, fluffy unicorns dancing on rainbows! Pink, fluffy unicorns dancing on rainbows! Pink, fluffy unicorns dancing on rainbows! Pink, fluffy unicorns dancing on, dancing on rainPink, fluffy unicorns dancing on rainbows! Pink, fluffy unicorns dancing on rainbows! Pink, fluffy unicorns dancing on rainbows! Pink, fluffy unicorns dancing on rainbows! Let's test your knowledge and see what you've learned so far! What color are the unicorns? Pink! Where are they dancing? Rainbows! Please use one word to describe the texture of their magical fur Smiles! Yeah! Pink, fluffy unicorns dancing on rainbows! Pink, fluffy unicorns dancing on rainbows! Pink, fluffy unicorns dancing on rainbows! Pink, fluffy unicorns dancing on rainbows! Pink, fluffy unicorns dancing on rainbows! Pink, fluffy unicorns dancing on rainbows! Pink, fluffy unicorns dancing on rainbows! Pink, fluffy unicorns dancing on, dancing on rainPink, fluffy unicorns dancing on rainbows! Pink, fluffy unicorns dancing on rainbows! Pink, fluffy unicorns dancing on rainbows! Pink, fluffy unicorns dancing on rainbows! Let's test your knowledge and see what you've learned so far! What color are the unicorns? Pink! Where are they dancing? Rainbows! Please use one word to describe the texture of their magical fur Smiles! Yeah! Pink, fluffy unicorns dancing on rainbows! Pink, fluffy unicorns dancing on rainbows! Pink, fluffy unicorns dancing on rainbows! Pink, fluffy unicorns dancing on rainbows! Pink, fluffy unicorns dancing on rainbows! Pink, fluffy unicorns dancing on rainbows! Pink, fluffy unicorns dancing on rainbows! Pink, fluffy unicorns dancing on, dancing on rainPink, fluffy unicorns dancing on rainbows! Pink, fluffy unicorns dancing on rainbows! Pink, fluffy unicorns dancing on rainbows! Pink, fluffy unicorns dancing on rainbows! Let's test your knowledge and see what you've learned so far! What color are the unicorns? Pink! Where are they dancing? Rainbows! Please use one word to describe the texture of their magical fur Smiles! Yeah! Pink, fluffy unicorns dancing on rainbows! Pink, fluffy unicorns dancing on rainbows! Pink, fluffy unicorns dancing on rainbows! Pink, fluffy unicorns dancing on rainbows! Pink, fluffy unicorns dancing on rainbows! Pink, fluffy unicorns dancing on rainbows! Pink, fluffy unicorns dancing on rainbows! Pink, fluffy unicorns dancing on, dancing on rainPink, fluffy unicorns dancing on rainbows! Pink, fluffy unicorns dancing on rainbows! Pink, fluffy unicorns dancing on rainbows! Pink, fluffy unicorns dancing on rainbows! Let's test your knowledge and see what you've learned so far! What color are the unicorns? Pink! Where are they dancing? Rainbows! Please use one word to describe the texture of their magical fur Smiles! Yeah! Pink, fluffy unicorns dancing on rainbows! Pink, fluffy unicorns dancing on rainbows! Pink, fluffy unicorns dancing on rainbows! Pink, fluffy unicorns dancing on rainbows! Pink, fluffy unicorns dancing on rainbows! Pink, fluffy unicorns dancing on rainbows! Pink, fluffy unicorns dancing on rainbows! Pink, fluffy unicorns dancing on, dancing on rainPink, fluffy unicorns dancing on rainbows! Pink, fluffy unicorns dancing on rainbows! Pink, fluffy unicorns dancing on rainbows! Pink, fluffy unicorns dancing on rainbows! Let's test your knowledge and see what you've learned so far! What color are the unicorns? Pink! Where are they dancing? Rainbows! Please use one word to describe the texture of their magical fur Smiles! Yeah! Pink, fluffy unicorns dancing on rainbows! Pink, fluffy unicorns dancing on rainbows! Pink, fluffy unicorns dancing on rainbows! Pink, fluffy unicorns dancing on rainbows! Pink, fluffy unicorns dancing on rainbows! Pink, fluffy unicorns dancing on rainbows! Pink, fluffy unicorns dancing on rainbows! Pink, fluffy unicorns dancing on, dancing on rainPink, fluffy unicorns dancing on rainbows! Pink, fluffy unicorns dancing on rainbows! Pink, fluffy unicorns dancing on rainbows! Pink, fluffy unicorns dancing on rainbows! Let's test your knowledge and see what you've learned so far! What color are the unicorns? Pink! Where are they dancing? Rainbows! Please use one word to describe the texture of their magical fur Smiles! Yeah! Pink, fluffy unicorns dancing on rainbows! Pink, fluffy unicorns dancing on rainbows! Pink, fluffy unicorns dancing on rainbows! Pink, fluffy unicorns dancing on rainbows! Pink, fluffy unicorns dancing on rainbows! Pink, fluffy unicorns dancing on rainbows! Pink, fluffy unicorns dancing on rainbows! Pink, fluffy unicorns dancing on, dancing on rainPink, fluffy unicorns dancing on rainbows! Pink, fluffy unicorns dancing on rainbows! Pink, fluffy unicorns dancing on rainbows! Pink, fluffy unicorns dancing on rainbows! Let's test your knowledge and see what you've learned so far! What color are the unicorns? Pink! Where are they dancing? Rainbows! Please use one word to describe the texture of their magical fur Smiles! Yeah! Pink, fluffy unicorns dancing on rainbows! Pink, fluffy unicorns dancing on rainbows! Pink, fluffy unicorns dancing on rainbows! Pink, fluffy unicorns dancing on rainbows! Pink, fluffy unicorns dancing on rainbows! Pink, fluffy unicorns dancing on rainbows! Pink, fluffy unicorns dancing on rainbows! Pink, fluffy unicorns dancing on, dancing on rainPink, fluffy unicorns dancing on rainbows! Pink, fluffy unicorns dancing on rainbows! Pink, fluffy unicorns dancing on rainbows! Pink, fluffy unicorns dancing on rainbows! Let's test your knowledge and see what you've learned so far! What color are the unicorns? Pink! Where are they dancing? Rainbows! Please use one word to describe the texture of their magical fur Smiles! Yeah! Pink, fluffy unicorns dancing on rainbows! Pink, fluffy unicorns dancing on rainbows! Pink, fluffy unicorns dancing on rainbows! Pink, fluffy unicorns dancing on rainbows! Pink, fluffy unicorns dancing on rainbows! Pink, fluffy unicorns dancing on rainbows! Pink, fluffy unicorns dancing on rainbows! Pink, fluffy unicorns dancing on, dancing on rainPink, fluffy unicorns dancing on rainbows! Pink, fluffy unicorns dancing on rainbows! Pink, fluffy unicorns dancing on rainbows! Pink, fluffy unicorns dancing on rainbows! Let's test your knowledge and see what you've learned so far! What color are the unicorns? Pink! Where are they dancing? Rainbows! Please use one word to describe the texture of their magical fur Smiles! Yeah! Pink, fluffy unicorns dancing on rainbows! Pink, fluffy unicorns dancing on rainbows! Pink, fluffy unicorns dancing on rainbows! Pink, fluffy unicorns dancing on rainbows! Pink, fluffy unicorns dancing on rainbows! Pink, fluffy unicorns dancing on rainbows! Pink, fluffy unicorns dancing on rainbows! Pink, fluffy unicorns dancing on, dancing on rainPink, fluffy unicorns dancing on rainbows! Pink, fluffy unicorns dancing on rainbows! Pink, fluffy unicorns dancing on rainbows! Pink, fluffy unicorns dancing on rainbows! Let's test your knowledge and see what you've learned so far! What color are the unicorns? Pink! Where are they dancing? Rainbows! Please use one word to describe the texture of their magical fur Smiles! Yeah! Pink, fluffy unicorns dancing on rainbows! Pink, fluffy unicorns dancing on rainbows! Pink, fluffy unicorns dancing on rainbows! Pink, fluffy unicorns dancing on rainbows! Pink, fluffy unicorns dancing on rainbows! Pink, fluffy unicorns dancing on rainbows! Pink, fluffy unicorns dancing on rainbows! Pink, fluffy unicorns dancing on, dancing on rainPink, fluffy unicorns dancing on rainbows! Pink, fluffy unicorns dancing on rainbows! Pink, fluffy unicorns dancing on rainbows! Pink, fluffy unicorns dancing on rainbows! Let's test your knowledge and see what you've learned so far! What color are the unicorns? Pink! Where are they dancing? Rainbows! Please use one word to describe the texture of their magical fur Smiles! Yeah! Pink, fluffy unicorns dancing on rainbows! Pink, fluffy unicorns dancing on rainbows! Pink, fluffy unicorns dancing on rainbows! Pink, fluffy unicorns dancing on rainbows! Pink, fluffy unicorns dancing on rainbows! Pink, fluffy unicorns dancing on rainbows! Pink, fluffy unicorns dancing on rainbows! Pink, fluffy unicorns dancing on, dancing on rainPink, fluffy unicorns dancing on rainbows! Pink, fluffy unicorns dancing on rainbows! Pink, fluffy unicorns dancing on rainbows! Pink, fluffy unicorns dancing on rainbows! Let's test your knowledge and see what you've learned so far! What color are the unicorns? Pink! Where are they dancing? Rainbows! Please use one word to describe the texture of their magical fur Smiles! Yeah! Pink, fluffy unicorns dancing on rainbows! Pink, fluffy unicorns dancing on rainbows! Pink, fluffy unicorns dancing on rainbows! Pink, fluffy unicorns dancing on rainbows! Pink, fluffy unicorns dancing on rainbows! Pink, fluffy unicorns dancing on rainbows! Pink, fluffy unicorns dancing on rainbows! Pink, fluffy unicorns dancing on, dancing on rainPink, fluffy unicorns dancing on rainbows! Pink, fluffy unicorns dancing on rainbows! Pink, fluffy unicorns dancing on rainbows! Pink, fluffy unicorns dancing on rainbows! Let's test your knowledge and see what you've learned so far! What color are the unicorns? Pink! Where are they dancing? Rainbows! Please use one word to describe the texture of their magical fur Smiles! Yeah! Pink, fluffy unicorns dancing on rainbows! Pink, fluffy unicorns dancing on rainbows! Pink, fluffy unicorns dancing on rainbows! Pink, fluffy unicorns dancing on rainbows! Pink, fluffy unicorns dancing on rainbows! Pink, fluffy unicorns dancing on rainbows! Pink, fluffy unicorns dancing on rainbows! Pink, fluffy unicorns dancing on, dancing on rainPink, fluffy unicorns dancing on rainbows! Pink, fluffy unicorns dancing on rainbows! Pink, fluffy unicorns dancing on rainbows! Pink, fluffy unicorns dancing on rainbows! Let's test your knowledge and see what you've learned so far! What color are the unicorns? Pink! Where are they dancing? Rainbows! Please use one word to describe the texture of their magical fur Smiles! Yeah! Pink, fluffy unicorns dancing on rainbows! Pink, fluffy unicorns dancing on rainbows! Pink, fluffy unicorns dancing on rainbows! Pink, fluffy unicorns dancing on rainbows! Pink, fluffy unicorns dancing on rainbows! Pink, fluffy unicorns dancing on rainbows! Pink, fluffy unicorns dancing on rainbows! Pink, fluffy unicorns dancing on, dancing on rainPink, fluffy unicorns dancing on rainbows! Pink, fluffy unicorns dancing on rainbows! Pink, fluffy unicorns dancing on rainbows! Pink, fluffy unicorns dancing on rainbows! Let's test your knowledge and see what you've learned so far! What color are the unicorns? Pink! Where are they dancing? Rainbows! Please use one word to describe the texture of their magical fur Smiles! Yeah! Pink, fluffy unicorns dancing on rainbows! Pink, fluffy unicorns dancing on rainbows! Pink, fluffy unicorns dancing on rainbows! Pink, fluffy unicorns dancing on rainbows! Pink, fluffy unicorns dancing on rainbows! Pink, fluffy unicorns dancing on rainbows! Pink, fluffy unicorns dancing on rainbows! Pink, fluffy unicorns dancing on, dancing on rainPink, fluffy unicorns dancing on rainbows! Pink, fluffy unicorns dancing on rainbows! Pink, fluffy unicorns dancing on rainbows! Pink, fluffy unicorns dancing on rainbows! Let's test your knowledge and see what you've learned so far! What color are the unicorns? Pink! Where are they dancing? Rainbows! Please use one word to describe the texture of their magical fur Smiles! Yeah! Pink, fluffy unicorns dancing on rainbows! Pink, fluffy unicorns dancing on rainbows! Pink, fluffy unicorns dancing on rainbows! Pink, fluffy unicorns dancing on rainbows! Pink, fluffy unicorns dancing on rainbows! Pink, fluffy unicorns dancing on rainbows! Pink, fluffy unicorns dancing on rainbows! Pink, fluffy unicorns dancing on, dancing on rainPink, fluffy unicorns dancing on rainbows! Pink, fluffy unicorns dancing on rainbows! Pink, fluffy unicorns dancing on rainbows! Pink, fluffy unicorns dancing on rainbows! Let's test your knowledge and see what you've learned so far! What color are the unicorns? Pink! Where are they dancing? Rainbows! Please use one word to describe the texture of their magical fur Smiles! Yeah! Pink, fluffy unicorns dancing on rainbows! Pink, fluffy unicorns dancing on rainbows! Pink, fluffy unicorns dancing on rainbows! Pink, fluffy unicorns dancing on rainbows! Pink, fluffy unicorns dancing on rainbows! Pink, fluffy unicorns dancing on rainbows! Pink, fluffy unicorns dancing on rainbows! Pink, fluffy unicorns dancing on, dancing on rainPink, fluffy unicorns dancing on rainbows! Pink, fluffy unicorns dancing on rainbows! Pink, fluffy unicorns dancing on rainbows! Pink, fluffy unicorns dancing on rainbows! Let's test your knowledge and see what you've learned so far! What color are the unicorns? Pink! Where are they dancing? Rainbows! Please use one word to describe the texture of their magical fur Smiles! Yeah! Pink, fluffy unicorns dancing on rainbows! Pink, fluffy unicorns dancing on rainbows! Pink, fluffy unicorns dancing on rainbows! Pink, fluffy unicorns dancing on rainbows! Pink, fluffy unicorns dancing on rainbows! Pink, fluffy unicorns dancing on rainbows! Pink, fluffy unicorns dancing on rainbows! Pink, fluffy unicorns dancing on, dancing on rainPink, fluffy unicorns dancing on rainbows! Pink, fluffy unicorns dancing on rainbows! Pink, fluffy unicorns dancing on rainbows! Pink, fluffy unicorns dancing on rainbows! Let's test your knowledge and see what you've learned so far! What color are the unicorns? Pink! Where are they dancing? Rainbows! Please use one word to describe the texture of their magical fur Smiles! Yeah! Pink, fluffy unicorns dancing on rainbows! Pink, fluffy unicorns dancing on rainbows! Pink, fluffy unicorns dancing on rainbows! Pink, fluffy unicorns dancing on rainbows! Pink, fluffy unicorns dancing on rainbows! Pink, fluffy unicorns dancing on rainbows! Pink, fluffy unicorns dancing on rainbows! Pink, fluffy unicorns dancing on, dancing on rainPink, fluffy unicorns dancing on rainbows! Pink, fluffy unicorns dancing on rainbows! Pink, fluffy unicorns dancing on rainbows! Pink, fluffy unicorns dancing on rainbows! Let's test your knowledge and see what you've learned so far! What color are the unicorns? Pink! Where are they dancing? Rainbows! Please use one word to describe the texture of their magical fur Smiles! Yeah! Pink, fluffy unicorns dancing on rainbows! Pink, fluffy unicorns dancing on rainbows! Pink, fluffy unicorns dancing on rainbows! Pink, fluffy unicorns dancing on rainbows! Pink, fluffy unicorns dancing on rainbows! Pink, fluffy unicorns dancing on rainbows! Pink, fluffy unicorns dancing on rainbows! Pink, fluffy unicorns dancing on, dancing on rainPink, fluffy unicorns dancing on rainbows! Pink, fluffy unicorns dancing on rainbows! Pink, fluffy unicorns dancing on rainbows! Pink, fluffy unicorns dancing on rainbows! Let's test your knowledge and see what you've learned so far! What color are the unicorns? Pink! Where are they dancing? Rainbows! Please use one word to describe the texture of their magical fur Smiles! Yeah! Pink, fluffy unicorns dancing on rainbows! Pink, fluffy unicorns dancing on rainbows! Pink, fluffy unicorns dancing on rainbows! Pink, fluffy unicorns dancing on rainbows! Pink, fluffy unicorns dancing on rainbows! Pink, fluffy unicorns dancing on rainbows! Pink, fluffy unicorns dancing on rainbows! Pink, fluffy unicorns dancing on, dancing on rainPink, fluffy unicorns dancing on rainbows! Pink, fluffy unicorns dancing on rainbows! Pink, fluffy unicorns dancing on rainbows! Pink, fluffy unicorns dancing on rainbows! Let's test your knowledge and see what you've learned so far! What color are the unicorns? Pink! Where are they dancing? Rainbows! Please use one word to describe the texture of their magical fur Smiles! Yeah! Pink, fluffy unicorns dancing on rainbows! Pink, fluffy unicorns dancing on rainbows! Pink, fluffy unicorns dancing on rainbows! Pink, fluffy unicorns dancing on rainbows! Pink, fluffy unicorns dancing on rainbows! Pink, fluffy unicorns dancing on rainbows! Pink, fluffy unicorns dancing on rainbows! Pink, fluffy unicorns dancing on, dancing on rainPink, fluffy unicorns dancing on rainbows! Pink, fluffy unicorns dancing on rainbows! Pink, fluffy unicorns dancing on rainbows! Pink, fluffy unicorns dancing on rainbows! Let's test your knowledge and see what you've learned so far! What color are the unicorns? Pink! Where are they dancing? Rainbows! Please use one word to describe the texture of their magical fur Smiles! Yeah! Pink, fluffy unicorns dancing on rainbows! Pink, fluffy unicorns dancing on rainbows! Pink, fluffy unicorns dancing on rainbows! Pink, fluffy unicorns dancing on rainbows! Pink, fluffy unicorns dancing on rainbows! Pink, fluffy unicorns dancing on rainbows! Pink, fluffy unicorns dancing on rainbows! Pink, fluffy unicorns dancing on, dancing on rainPink, fluffy unicorns dancing on rainbows! Pink, fluffy unicorns dancing on rainbows! Pink, fluffy unicorns dancing on rainbows! Pink, fluffy unicorns dancing on rainbows! Let's test your knowledge and see what you've learned so far! What color are the unicorns? Pink! Where are they dancing? Rainbows! Please use one word to describe the texture of their magical fur Smiles! Yeah! Pink, fluffy unicorns dancing on rainbows! Pink, fluffy unicorns dancing on rainbows! Pink, fluffy unicorns dancing on rainbows! Pink, fluffy unicorns dancing on rainbows! Pink, fluffy unicorns dancing on rainbows! Pink, fluffy unicorns dancing on rainbows! Pink, fluffy unicorns dancing on rainbows! Pink, fluffy unicorns dancing on, dancing on rainPink, fluffy unicorns dancing on rainbows! Pink, fluffy unicorns dancing on rainbows! Pink, fluffy unicorns dancing on rainbows! Pink, fluffy unicorns dancing on rainbows! Let's test your knowledge and see what you've learned so far! What color are the unicorns? Pink! Where are they dancing? Rainbows! Please use one word to describe the texture of their magical fur Smiles! Yeah! Pink, fluffy unicorns dancing on rainbows! Pink, fluffy unicorns dancing on rainbows! Pink, fluffy unicorns dancing on rainbows! Pink, fluffy unicorns dancing on rainbows! Pink, fluffy unicorns dancing on rainbows! Pink, fluffy unicorns dancing on rainbows! Pink, fluffy unicorns dancing on rainbows! Pink, fluffy unicorns dancing on, dancing on rainPink, fluffy unicorns dancing on rainbows! Pink, fluffy unicorns dancing on rainbows! Pink, fluffy unicorns dancing on rainbows! Pink, fluffy unicorns dancing on rainbows! Let's test your knowledge and see what you've learned so far! What color are the unicorns? Pink! Where are they dancing? Rainbows! Please use one word to describe the texture of their magical fur Smiles! Yeah! Pink, fluffy unicorns dancing on rainbows! Pink, fluffy unicorns dancing on rainbows! Pink, fluffy unicorns dancing on rainbows! Pink, fluffy unicorns dancing on rainbows! Pink, fluffy unicorns dancing on rainbows! Pink, fluffy unicorns dancing on rainbows! Pink, fluffy unicorns dancing on rainbows! Pink, fluffy unicorns dancing on, dancing on rainPink, fluffy unicorns dancing on rainbows! Pink, fluffy unicorns dancing on rainbows! Pink, fluffy unicorns dancing on rainbows! Pink, fluffy unicorns dancing on rainbows! Let's test your knowledge and see what you've learned so far! What color are the unicorns? Pink! Where are they dancing? Rainbows! Please use one word to describe the texture of their magical fur Smiles! Yeah! Pink, fluffy unicorns dancing on rainbows! Pink, fluffy unicorns dancing on rainbows! Pink, fluffy unicorns dancing on rainbows! Pink, fluffy unicorns dancing on rainbows! Pink, fluffy unicorns dancing on rainbows! Pink, fluffy unicorns dancing on rainbows! Pink, fluffy unicorns dancing on rainbows! Pink, fluffy unicorns dancing on, dancing on rainPink, fluffy unicorns dancing on rainbows! Pink, fluffy unicorns dancing on rainbows! Pink, fluffy unicorns dancing on rainbows! Pink, fluffy unicorns dancing on rainbows! Let's test your knowledge and see what you've learned so far! What color are the unicorns? Pink! Where are they dancing? Rainbows! Please use one word to describe the texture of their magical fur Smiles! Yeah! Pink, fluffy unicorns dancing on rainbows! Pink, fluffy unicorns dancing on rainbows! Pink, fluffy unicorns dancing on rainbows! Pink, fluffy unicorns dancing on rainbows! Pink, fluffy unicorns dancing on rainbows! Pink, fluffy unicorns dancing on rainbows! Pink, fluffy unicorns dancing on rainbows! Pink, fluffy unicorns dancing on, dancing on rainPink, fluffy unicorns dancing on rainbows! Pink, fluffy unicorns dancing on rainbows! Pink, fluffy unicorns dancing on rainbows! Pink, fluffy unicorns dancing on rainbows! Let's test your knowledge and see what you've learned so far! What color are the unicorns? Pink! Where are they dancing? Rainbows! Please use one word to describe the texture of their magical fur Smiles! Yeah! Pink, fluffy unicorns dancing on rainbows! Pink, fluffy unicorns dancing on rainbows! Pink, fluffy unicorns dancing on rainbows! Pink, fluffy unicorns dancing on rainbows! Pink, fluffy unicorns dancing on rainbows! Pink, fluffy unicorns dancing on rainbows! Pink, fluffy unicorns dancing on rainbows! Pink, fluffy unicorns dancing on, dancing on rainPink, fluffy unicorns dancing on rainbows! Pink, fluffy unicorns dancing on rainbows! Pink, fluffy unicorns dancing on rainbows! Pink, fluffy unicorns dancing on rainbows! Let's test your knowledge and see what you've learned so far! What color are the unicorns? Pink! Where are they dancing? Rainbows! Please use one word to describe the texture of their magical fur Smiles! Yeah! Pink, fluffy unicorns dancing on rainbows! Pink, fluffy unicorns dancing on rainbows! Pink, fluffy unicorns dancing on rainbows! Pink, fluffy unicorns dancing on rainbows! Pink, fluffy unicorns dancing on rainbows! Pink, fluffy unicorns dancing on rainbows! Pink, fluffy unicorns dancing on rainbows! Pink, fluffy unicorns dancing on, dancing on rainPink, fluffy unicorns dancing on rainbows! Pink, fluffy unicorns dancing on rainbows! Pink, fluffy unicorns dancing on rainbows! Pink, fluffy unicorns dancing on rainbows! Let's test your knowledge and see what you've learned so far! What color are the unicorns? Pink! Where are they dancing? Rainbows! Please use one word to describe the texture of their magical fur Smiles! Yeah! Pink, fluffy unicorns dancing on rainbows! Pink, fluffy unicorns dancing on rainbows! Pink, fluffy unicorns dancing on rainbows! Pink, fluffy unicorns dancing on rainbows! Pink, fluffy unicorns dancing on rainbows! Pink, fluffy unicorns dancing on rainbows! Pink, fluffy unicorns dancing on rainbows! Pink, fluffy unicorns dancing on, dancing on rainPink, fluffy unicorns dancing on rainbows! Pink, fluffy unicorns dancing on rainbows! Pink, fluffy unicorns dancing on rainbows! Pink, fluffy unicorns dancing on rainbows! Let's test your knowledge and see what you've learned so far! What color are the unicorns? Pink! Where are they dancing? Rainbows! Please use one word to describe the texture of their magical fur Smiles! Yeah! Pink, fluffy unicorns dancing on rainbows! Pink, fluffy unicorns dancing on rainbows! Pink, fluffy unicorns dancing on rainbows! Pink, fluffy unicorns dancing on rainbows! Pink, fluffy unicorns dancing on rainbows! Pink, fluffy unicorns dancing on rainbows! Pink, fluffy unicorns dancing on rainbows! Pink, fluffy unicorns dancing on, dancing on rainPink, fluffy unicorns dancing on rainbows! Pink, fluffy unicorns dancing on rainbows! Pink, fluffy unicorns dancing on rainbows! Pink, fluffy unicorns dancing on rainbows! Let's test your knowledge and see what you've learned so far! What color are the unicorns? Pink! Where are they dancing? Rainbows! Please use one word to describe the texture of their magical fur Smiles! Yeah! Pink, fluffy unicorns dancing on rainbows! Pink, fluffy unicorns dancing on rainbows! Pink, fluffy unicorns dancing on rainbows! Pink, fluffy unicorns dancing on rainbows! Pink, fluffy unicorns dancing on rainbows! Pink, fluffy unicorns dancing on rainbows! Pink, fluffy unicorns dancing on rainbows! Pink, fluffy unicorns dancing on, dancing on rainPink, fluffy unicorns dancing on rainbows! Pink, fluffy unicorns dancing on rainbows! Pink, fluffy unicorns dancing on rainbows! Pink, fluffy unicorns dancing on rainbows! Let's test your knowledge and see what you've learned so far! What color are the unicorns? Pink! Where are they dancing? Rainbows! Please use one word to describe the texture of their magical fur Smiles! Yeah! Pink, fluffy unicorns dancing on rainbows! Pink, fluffy unicorns dancing on rainbows! Pink, fluffy unicorns dancing on rainbows! Pink, fluffy unicorns dancing on rainbows! Pink, fluffy unicorns dancing on rainbows! Pink, fluffy unicorns dancing on rainbows! Pink, fluffy unicorns dancing on rainbows! Pink, fluffy unicorns dancing on, dancing on rainPink, fluffy unicorns dancing on rainbows! Pink, fluffy unicorns dancing on rainbows! Pink, fluffy unicorns dancing on rainbows! Pink, fluffy unicorns dancing on rainbows! Let's test your knowledge and see what you've learned so far! What color are the unicorns? Pink! Where are they dancing? Rainbows! Please use one word to describe the texture of their magical fur Smiles! Yeah! Pink, fluffy unicorns dancing on rainbows! Pink, fluffy unicorns dancing on rainbows! Pink, fluffy unicorns dancing on rainbows! Pink, fluffy unicorns dancing on rainbows! Pink, fluffy unicorns dancing on rainbows! Pink, fluffy unicorns dancing on rainbows! Pink, fluffy unicorns dancing on rainbows! Pink, fluffy unicorns dancing on, dancing on rainPink, fluffy unicorns dancing on rainbows! Pink, fluffy unicorns dancing on rainbows! Pink, fluffy unicorns dancing on rainbows! Pink, fluffy unicorns dancing on rainbows! Let's test your knowledge and see what you've learned so far! What color are the unicorns? Pink! Where are they dancing? Rainbows! Please use one word to describe the texture of their magical fur Smiles! Yeah! Pink, fluffy unicorns dancing on rainbows! Pink, fluffy unicorns dancing on rainbows! Pink, fluffy unicorns dancing on rainbows! Pink, fluffy unicorns dancing on rainbows! Pink, fluffy unicorns dancing on rainbows! Pink, fluffy unicorns dancing on rainbows! Pink, fluffy unicorns dancing on rainbows! Pink, fluffy unicorns dancing on, dancing on rainPink, fluffy unicorns dancing on rainbows! Pink, fluffy unicorns dancing on rainbows! Pink, fluffy unicorns dancing on rainbows! Pink, fluffy unicorns dancing on rainbows! Let's test your knowledge and see what you've learned so far! What color are the unicorns? Pink! Where are they dancing? Rainbows! Please use one word to describe the texture of their magical fur Smiles! Yeah! Pink, fluffy unicorns dancing on rainbows! Pink, fluffy unicorns dancing on rainbows! Pink, fluffy unicorns dancing on rainbows! Pink, fluffy unicorns dancing on rainbows! Pink, fluffy unicorns dancing on rainbows! Pink, fluffy unicorns dancing on rainbows! Pink, fluffy unicorns dancing on rainbows! Pink, fluffy unicorns dancing on, dancing on rainPink, fluffy unicorns dancing on rainbows! Pink, fluffy unicorns dancing on rainbows! Pink, fluffy unicorns dancing on rainbows! Pink, fluffy unicorns dancing on rainbows! Let's test your knowledge and see what you've learned so far! What color are the unicorns? Pink! Where are they dancing? Rainbows! Please use one word to describe the texture of their magical fur Smiles! Yeah! Pink, fluffy unicorns dancing on rainbows! Pink, fluffy unicorns dancing on rainbows! Pink, fluffy unicorns dancing on rainbows! Pink, fluffy unicorns dancing on rainbows! Pink, fluffy unicorns dancing on rainbows! Pink, fluffy unicorns dancing on rainbows! Pink, fluffy unicorns dancing on rainbows! Pink, fluffy unicorns dancing on, dancing on rainPink, fluffy unicorns dancing on rainbows! Pink, fluffy unicorns dancing on rainbows! Pink, fluffy unicorns dancing on rainbows! Pink, fluffy unicorns dancing on rainbows! Let's test your knowledge and see what you've learned so far! What color are the unicorns? Pink! Where are they dancing? Rainbows! Please use one word to describe the texture of their magical fur Smiles! Yeah! Pink, fluffy unicorns dancing on rainbows! Pink, fluffy unicorns dancing on rainbows! Pink, fluffy unicorns dancing on rainbows! Pink, fluffy unicorns dancing on rainbows! Pink, fluffy unicorns dancing on rainbows! Pink, fluffy unicorns dancing on rainbows! Pink, fluffy unicorns dancing on rainbows! Pink, fluffy unicorns dancing on, dancing on rainPink, fluffy unicorns dancing on rainbows! Pink, fluffy unicorns dancing on rainbows! Pink, fluffy unicorns dancing on rainbows! Pink, fluffy unicorns dancing on rainbows! Let's test your knowledge and see what you've learned so far! What color are the unicorns? Pink! Where are they dancing? Rainbows! Please use one word to describe the texture of their magical fur Smiles! Yeah! Pink, fluffy unicorns dancing on rainbows! Pink, fluffy unicorns dancing on rainbows! Pink, fluffy unicorns dancing on rainbows! Pink, fluffy unicorns dancing on rainbows! Pink, fluffy unicorns dancing on rainbows! Pink, fluffy unicorns dancing on rainbows! Pink, fluffy unicorns dancing on rainbows! Pink, fluffy unicorns dancing on, dancing on rainPink, fluffy unicorns dancing on rainbows! Pink, fluffy unicorns dancing on rainbows! Pink, fluffy unicorns dancing on rainbows! Pink, fluffy unicorns dancing on rainbows! Let's test your knowledge and see what you've learned so far! What color are the unicorns? Pink! Where are they dancing? Rainbows! Please use one word to describe the texture of their magical fur Smiles! Yeah! Pink, fluffy unicorns dancing on rainbows! Pink, fluffy unicorns dancing on rainbows! Pink, fluffy unicorns dancing on rainbows! Pink, fluffy unicorns dancing on rainbows! Pink, fluffy unicorns dancing on rainbows! Pink, fluffy unicorns dancing on rainbows! Pink, fluffy unicorns dancing on rainbows! Pink, fluffy unicorns dancing on, dancing on rainPink, fluffy unicorns dancing on rainbows! Pink, fluffy unicorns dancing on rainbows! Pink, fluffy unicorns dancing on rainbows! Pink, fluffy unicorns dancing on rainbows! Let's test your knowledge and see what you've learned so far! What color are the unicorns? Pink! Where are they dancing? Rainbows! Please use one word to describe the texture of their magical fur Smiles! Yeah! Pink, fluffy unicorns dancing on rainbows! Pink, fluffy unicorns dancing on rainbows! Pink, fluffy unicorns dancing on rainbows! Pink, fluffy unicorns dancing on rainbows! Pink, fluffy unicorns dancing on rainbows! Pink, fluffy unicorns dancing on rainbows! Pink, fluffy unicorns dancing on rainbows! Pink, fluffy unicorns dancing on, dancing on rainPink, fluffy unicorns dancing on rainbows! Pink, fluffy unicorns dancing on rainbows! Pink, fluffy unicorns dancing on rainbows! Pink, fluffy unicorns dancing on rainbows! Let's test your knowledge and see what you've learned so far! What color are the unicorns? Pink! Where are they dancing? Rainbows! Please use one word to describe the texture of their magical fur Smiles! Yeah! Pink, fluffy unicorns dancing on rainbows! Pink, fluffy unicorns dancing on rainbows! Pink, fluffy unicorns dancing on rainbows! Pink, fluffy unicorns dancing on rainbows! Pink, fluffy unicorns dancing on rainbows! Pink, fluffy unicorns dancing on rainbows! Pink, fluffy unicorns dancing on rainbows! Pink, fluffy unicorns dancing on, dancing on rainPink, fluffy unicorns dancing on rainbows! Pink, fluffy unicorns dancing on rainbows! Pink, fluffy unicorns dancing on rainbows! Pink, fluffy unicorns dancing on rainbows! Let's test your knowledge and see what you've learned so far! What color are the unicorns? Pink! Where are they dancing? Rainbows! Please use one word to describe the texture of their magical fur Smiles! Yeah! Pink, fluffy unicorns dancing on rainbows! Pink, fluffy unicorns dancing on rainbows! Pink, fluffy unicorns dancing on rainbows! Pink, fluffy unicorns dancing on rainbows! Pink, fluffy unicorns dancing on rainbows! Pink, fluffy unicorns dancing on rainbows! Pink, fluffy unicorns dancing on rainbows! Pink, fluffy unicorns dancing on, dancing on rainPink, fluffy unicorns dancing on rainbows! Pink, fluffy unicorns dancing on rainbows! Pink, fluffy unicorns dancing on rainbows! Pink, fluffy unicorns dancing on rainbows! Let's test your knowledge and see what you've learned so far! What color are the unicorns? Pink! Where are they dancing? Rainbows! Please use one word to describe the texture of their magical fur Smiles! Yeah! Pink, fluffy unicorns dancing on rainbows! Pink, fluffy unicorns dancing on rainbows! Pink, fluffy unicorns dancing on rainbows! Pink, fluffy unicorns dancing on rainbows! Pink, fluffy unicorns dancing on rainbows! Pink, fluffy unicorns dancing on rainbows! Pink, fluffy unicorns dancing on rainbows! Pink, fluffy unicorns dancing on, dancing on rainPink, fluffy unicorns dancing on rainbows! Pink, fluffy unicorns dancing on rainbows! Pink, fluffy unicorns dancing on rainbows! Pink, fluffy unicorns dancing on rainbows! Let's test your knowledge and see what you've learned so far! What color are the unicorns? Pink! Where are they dancing? Rainbows! Please use one word to describe the texture of their magical fur Smiles! Yeah! Pink, fluffy unicorns dancing on rainbows! Pink, fluffy unicorns dancing on rainbows! Pink, fluffy unicorns dancing on rainbows! Pink, fluffy unicorns dancing on rainbows! Pink, fluffy unicorns dancing on rainbows! Pink, fluffy unicorns dancing on rainbows! Pink, fluffy unicorns dancing on rainbows! Pink, fluffy unicorns dancing on, dancing on rainPink, fluffy unicorns dancing on rainbows! Pink, fluffy unicorns dancing on rainbows! Pink, fluffy unicorns dancing on rainbows! Pink, fluffy unicorns dancing on rainbows! Let's test your knowledge and see what you've learned so far! What color are the unicorns? Pink! Where are they dancing? Rainbows! Please use one word to describe the texture of their magical fur Smiles! Yeah! Pink, fluffy unicorns dancing on rainbows! Pink, fluffy unicorns dancing on rainbows! Pink, fluffy unicorns dancing on rainbows! Pink, fluffy unicorns dancing on rainbows! Pink, fluffy unicorns dancing on rainbows! Pink, fluffy unicorns dancing on rainbows! Pink, fluffy unicorns dancing on rainbows! Pink, fluffy unicorns dancing on, dancing on rainPink, fluffy unicorns dancing on rainbows! Pink, fluffy unicorns dancing on rainbows! Pink, fluffy unicorns dancing on rainbows! Pink, fluffy unicorns dancing on rainbows! Let's test your knowledge and see what you've learned so far! What color are the unicorns? Pink! Where are they dancing? Rainbows! Please use one word to describe the texture of their magical fur Smiles! Yeah! Pink, fluffy unicorns dancing on rainbows! Pink, fluffy unicorns dancing on rainbows! Pink, fluffy unicorns dancing on rainbows! Pink, fluffy unicorns dancing on rainbows! Pink, fluffy unicorns dancing on rainbows! Pink, fluffy unicorns dancing on rainbows! Pink, fluffy unicorns dancing on rainbows! Pink, fluffy unicorns dancing on, dancing on rainPink, fluffy unicorns dancing on rainbows! Pink, fluffy unicorns dancing on rainbows! Pink, fluffy unicorns dancing on rainbows! Pink, fluffy unicorns dancing on rainbows! Let's test your knowledge and see what you've learned so far! What color are the unicorns? Pink! Where are they dancing? Rainbows! Please use one word to describe the texture of their magical fur Smiles! Yeah! Pink, fluffy unicorns dancing on rainbows! Pink, fluffy unicorns dancing on rainbows! Pink, fluffy unicorns dancing on rainbows! Pink, fluffy unicorns dancing on rainbows! Pink, fluffy unicorns dancing on rainbows! Pink, fluffy unicorns dancing on rainbows! Pink, fluffy unicorns dancing on rainbows! Pink, fluffy unicorns dancing on, dancing on rainPink, fluffy unicorns dancing on rainbows! Pink, fluffy unicorns dancing on rainbows! Pink, fluffy unicorns dancing on rainbows! Pink, fluffy unicorns dancing on rainbows! Let's test your knowledge and see what you've learned so far! What color are the unicorns? Pink! Where are they dancing? Rainbows! Please use one word to describe the texture of their magical fur Smiles! Yeah! Pink, fluffy unicorns dancing on rainbows! Pink, fluffy unicorns dancing on rainbows! Pink, fluffy unicorns dancing on rainbows! Pink, fluffy unicorns dancing on rainbows! Pink, fluffy unicorns dancing on rainbows! Pink, fluffy unicorns dancing on rainbows! Pink, fluffy unicorns dancing on rainbows! Pink, fluffy unicorns dancing on, dancing on rainPink, fluffy unicorns dancing on rainbows! Pink, fluffy unicorns dancing on rainbows! Pink, fluffy unicorns dancing on rainbows! Pink, fluffy unicorns dancing on rainbows! Let's test your knowledge and see what you've learned so far! What color are the unicorns? Pink! Where are they dancing? Rainbows! Please use one word to describe the texture of their magical fur Smiles! Yeah! Pink, fluffy unicorns dancing on rainbows! Pink, fluffy unicorns dancing on rainbows! Pink, fluffy unicorns dancing on rainbows! Pink, fluffy unicorns dancing on rainbows! Pink, fluffy unicorns dancing on rainbows! Pink, fluffy unicorns dancing on rainbows! Pink, fluffy unicorns dancing on rainbows! Pink, fluffy unicorns dancing on, dancing on rainPink, fluffy unicorns dancing on rainbows! Pink, fluffy unicorns dancing on rainbows! Pink, fluffy unicorns dancing on rainbows! Pink, fluffy unicorns dancing on rainbows! Let's test your knowledge and see what you've learned so far! What color are the unicorns? Pink! Where are they dancing? Rainbows! Please use one word to describe the texture of their magical fur Smiles! Yeah! Pink, fluffy unicorns dancing on rainbows! Pink, fluffy unicorns dancing on rainbows! Pink, fluffy unicorns dancing on rainbows! Pink, fluffy unicorns dancing on rainbows! Pink, fluffy unicorns dancing on rainbows! Pink, fluffy unicorns dancing on rainbows! Pink, fluffy unicorns dancing on rainbows! Pink, fluffy unicorns dancing on, dancing on rainPink, fluffy unicorns dancing on rainbows! Pink, fluffy unicorns dancing on rainbows! Pink, fluffy unicorns dancing on rainbows! Pink, fluffy unicorns dancing on rainbows! Let's test your knowledge and see what you've learned so far! What color are the unicorns? Pink! Where are they dancing? Rainbows! Please use one word to describe the texture of their magical fur Smiles! Yeah! Pink, fluffy unicorns dancing on rainbows! Pink, fluffy unicorns dancing on rainbows! Pink, fluffy unicorns dancing on rainbows! Pink, fluffy unicorns dancing on rainbows! Pink, fluffy unicorns dancing on rainbows! Pink, fluffy unicorns dancing on rainbows! Pink, fluffy unicorns dancing on rainbows! Pink, fluffy unicorns dancing on, dancing on rainPink, fluffy unicorns dancing on rainbows! Pink, fluffy unicorns dancing on rainbows! Pink, fluffy unicorns dancing on rainbows! Pink, fluffy unicorns dancing on rainbows! Let's test your knowledge and see what you've learned so far! What color are the unicorns? Pink! Where are they dancing? Rainbows! Please use one word to describe the texture of their magical fur Smiles! Yeah! Pink, fluffy unicorns dancing on rainbows! Pink, fluffy unicorns dancing on rainbows! Pink, fluffy unicorns dancing on rainbows! Pink, fluffy unicorns dancing on rainbows! Pink, fluffy unicorns dancing on rainbows! Pink, fluffy unicorns dancing on rainbows! Pink, fluffy unicorns dancing on rainbows! Pink, fluffy unicorns dancing on, dancing on rainPink, fluffy unicorns dancing on rainbows! Pink, fluffy unicorns dancing on rainbows! Pink, fluffy unicorns dancing on rainbows! Pink, fluffy unicorns dancing on rainbows! Let's test your knowledge and see what you've learned so far! What color are the unicorns? Pink! Where are they dancing? Rainbows! Please use one word to describe the texture of their magical fur Smiles! Yeah! Pink, fluffy unicorns dancing on rainbows! Pink, fluffy unicorns dancing on rainbows! Pink, fluffy unicorns dancing on rainbows! Pink, fluffy unicorns dancing on rainbows! Pink, fluffy unicorns dancing on rainbows! Pink, fluffy unicorns dancing on rainbows! Pink, fluffy unicorns dancing on rainbows! Pink, fluffy unicorns dancing on, dancing on rainPink, fluffy unicorns dancing on rainbows! Pink, fluffy unicorns dancing on rainbows! Pink, fluffy unicorns dancing on rainbows! Pink, fluffy unicorns dancing on rainbows! Let's test your knowledge and see what you've learned so far! What color are the unicorns? Pink! Where are they dancing? Rainbows! Please use one word to describe the texture of their magical fur Smiles! Yeah! Pink, fluffy unicorns dancing on rainbows! Pink, fluffy unicorns dancing on rainbows! Pink, fluffy unicorns dancing on rainbows! Pink, fluffy unicorns dancing on rainbows! Pink, fluffy unicorns dancing on rainbows! Pink, fluffy unicorns dancing on rainbows! Pink, fluffy unicorns dancing on rainbows! Pink, fluffy unicorns dancing on, dancing on rainPink, fluffy unicorns dancing on rainbows! Pink, fluffy unicorns dancing on rainbows! Pink, fluffy unicorns dancing on rainbows! Pink, fluffy unicorns dancing on rainbows! Let's test your knowledge and see what you've learned so far! What color are the unicorns? Pink! Where are they dancing? Rainbows! Please use one word to describe the texture of their magical fur Smiles! Yeah! Pink, fluffy unicorns dancing on rainbows! Pink, fluffy unicorns dancing on rainbows! Pink, fluffy unicorns dancing on rainbows! Pink, fluffy unicorns dancing on rainbows! Pink, fluffy unicorns dancing on rainbows! Pink, fluffy unicorns dancing on rainbows! Pink, fluffy unicorns dancing on rainbows! Pink, fluffy unicorns dancing on, dancing on rainPink, fluffy unicorns dancing on rainbows! Pink, fluffy unicorns dancing on rainbows! Pink, fluffy unicorns dancing on rainbows! Pink, fluffy unicorns dancing on rainbows! Let's test your knowledge and see what you've learned so far! What color are the unicorns? Pink! Where are they dancing? Rainbows! Please use one word to describe the texture of their magical fur Smiles! Yeah! Pink, fluffy unicorns dancing on rainbows! Pink, fluffy unicorns dancing on rainbows! Pink, fluffy unicorns dancing on rainbows! Pink, fluffy unicorns dancing on rainbows! Pink, fluffy unicorns dancing on rainbows! Pink, fluffy unicorns dancing on rainbows! Pink, fluffy unicorns dancing on rainbows! Pink, fluffy unicorns dancing on, dancing on rainPink, fluffy unicorns dancing on rainbows! Pink, fluffy unicorns dancing on rainbows! Pink, fluffy unicorns dancing on rainbows! Pink, fluffy unicorns dancing on rainbows! Let's test your knowledge and see what you've learned so far! What color are the unicorns? Pink! Where are they dancing? Rainbows! Please use one word to describe the texture of their magical fur Smiles! Yeah! Pink, fluffy unicorns dancing on rainbows! Pink, fluffy unicorns dancing on rainbows! Pink, fluffy unicorns dancing on rainbows! Pink, fluffy unicorns dancing on rainbows! Pink, fluffy unicorns dancing on rainbows! Pink, fluffy unicorns dancing on rainbows! Pink, fluffy unicorns dancing on rainbows! Pink, fluffy unicorns dancing on, dancing on rainPink, fluffy unicorns dancing on rainbows! Pink, fluffy unicorns dancing on rainbows! Pink, fluffy unicorns dancing on rainbows! Pink, fluffy unicorns dancing on rainbows! Let's test your knowledge and see what you've learned so far! What color are the unicorns? Pink! Where are they dancing? Rainbows! Please use one word to describe the texture of their magical fur Smiles! Yeah! Pink, fluffy unicorns dancing on rainbows! Pink, fluffy unicorns dancing on rainbows! Pink, fluffy unicorns dancing on rainbows! Pink, fluffy unicorns dancing on rainbows! Pink, fluffy unicorns dancing on rainbows! Pink, fluffy unicorns dancing on rainbows! Pink, fluffy unicorns dancing on rainbows! Pink, fluffy unicorns dancing on, dancing on rainPink, fluffy unicorns dancing on rainbows! Pink, fluffy unicorns dancing on rainbows! Pink, fluffy unicorns dancing on rainbows! Pink, fluffy unicorns dancing on rainbows! Let's test your knowledge and see what you've learned so far! What color are the unicorns? Pink! Where are they dancing? Rainbows! Please use one word to describe the texture of their magical fur Smiles! Yeah! Pink, fluffy unicorns dancing on rainbows! Pink, fluffy unicorns dancing on rainbows! Pink, fluffy unicorns dancing on rainbows! Pink, fluffy unicorns dancing on rainbows! Pink, fluffy unicorns dancing on rainbows! Pink, fluffy unicorns dancing on rainbows! Pink, fluffy unicorns dancing on rainbows! Pink, fluffy unicorns dancing on, dancing on rainPink, fluffy unicorns dancing on rainbows! Pink, fluffy unicorns dancing on rainbows! Pink, fluffy unicorns dancing on rainbows! Pink, fluffy unicorns dancing on rainbows! Let's test your knowledge and see what you've learned so far! What color are the unicorns? Pink! Where are they dancing? Rainbows! Please use one word to describe the texture of their magical fur Smiles! Yeah! Pink, fluffy unicorns dancing on rainbows! Pink, fluffy unicorns dancing on rainbows! Pink, fluffy unicorns dancing on rainbows! Pink, fluffy unicorns dancing on rainbows! Pink, fluffy unicorns dancing on rainbows! Pink, fluffy unicorns dancing on rainbows! Pink, fluffy unicorns dancing on rainbows! Pink, fluffy unicorns dancing on, dancing on rainPink, fluffy unicorns dancing on rainbows! Pink, fluffy unicorns dancing on rainbows! Pink, fluffy unicorns dancing on rainbows! Pink, fluffy unicorns dancing on rainbows! Let's test your knowledge and see what you've learned so far! What color are the unicorns? Pink! Where are they dancing? Rainbows! Please use one word to describe the texture of their magical fur Smiles! Yeah! Pink, fluffy unicorns dancing on rainbows! Pink, fluffy unicorns dancing on rainbows! Pink, fluffy unicorns dancing on rainbows! Pink, fluffy unicorns dancing on rainbows! Pink, fluffy unicorns dancing on rainbows! Pink, fluffy unicorns dancing on rainbows! Pink, fluffy unicorns dancing on rainbows! Pink, fluffy unicorns dancing on, dancing on rainPink, fluffy unicorns dancing on rainbows! Pink, fluffy unicorns dancing on rainbows! Pink, fluffy unicorns dancing on rainbows! Pink, fluffy unicorns dancing on rainbows! Let's test your knowledge and see what you've learned so far! What color are the unicorns? Pink! Where are they dancing? Rainbows! Please use one word to describe the texture of their magical fur Smiles! Yeah! Pink, fluffy unicorns dancing on rainbows! Pink, fluffy unicorns dancing on rainbows! Pink, fluffy unicorns dancing on rainbows! Pink, fluffy unicorns dancing on rainbows! Pink, fluffy unicorns dancing on rainbows! Pink, fluffy unicorns dancing on rainbows! Pink, fluffy unicorns dancing on rainbows! Pink, fluffy unicorns dancing on, dancing on rainPink, fluffy unicorns dancing on rainbows! Pink, fluffy unicorns dancing on rainbows! Pink, fluffy unicorns dancing on rainbows! Pink, fluffy unicorns dancing on rainbows! Let's test your knowledge and see what you've learned so far! What color are the unicorns? Pink! Where are they dancing? Rainbows! Please use one word to describe the texture of their magical fur Smiles! Yeah! Pink, fluffy unicorns dancing on rainbows! Pink, fluffy unicorns dancing on rainbows! Pink, fluffy unicorns dancing on rainbows! Pink, fluffy unicorns dancing on rainbows! Pink, fluffy unicorns dancing on rainbows! Pink, fluffy unicorns dancing on rainbows! Pink, fluffy unicorns dancing on rainbows! Pink, fluffy unicorns dancing on, dancing on rainPink, fluffy unicorns dancing on rainbows! Pink, fluffy unicorns dancing on rainbows! Pink, fluffy unicorns dancing on rainbows! Pink, fluffy unicorns dancing on rainbows! Let's test your knowledge and see what you've learned so far! What color are the unicorns? Pink! Where are they dancing? Rainbows! Please use one word to describe the texture of their magical fur Smiles! Yeah! Pink, fluffy unicorns dancing on rainbows! Pink, fluffy unicorns dancing on rainbows! Pink, fluffy unicorns dancing on rainbows! Pink, fluffy unicorns dancing on rainbows! Pink, fluffy unicorns dancing on rainbows! Pink, fluffy unicorns dancing on rainbows! Pink, fluffy unicorns dancing on rainbows! Pink, fluffy unicorns dancing on, dancing on rainPink, fluffy unicorns dancing on rainbows! Pink, fluffy unicorns dancing on rainbows! Pink, fluffy unicorns dancing on rainbows! Pink, fluffy unicorns dancing on rainbows! Let's test your knowledge and see what you've learned so far! What color are the unicorns? Pink! Where are they dancing? Rainbows! Please use one word to describe the texture of their magical fur Smiles! Yeah! Pink, fluffy unicorns dancing on rainbows! Pink, fluffy unicorns dancing on rainbows! Pink, fluffy unicorns dancing on rainbows! Pink, fluffy unicorns dancing on rainbows! Pink, fluffy unicorns dancing on rainbows! Pink, fluffy unicorns dancing on rainbows! Pink, fluffy unicorns dancing on rainbows! Pink, fluffy unicorns dancing on, dancing on rainPink, fluffy unicorns dancing on rainbows! Pink, fluffy unicorns dancing on rainbows! Pink, fluffy unicorns dancing on rainbows! Pink, fluffy unicorns dancing on rainbows! Let's test your knowledge and see what you've learned so far! What color are the unicorns? Pink! Where are they dancing? Rainbows! Please use one word to describe the texture of their magical fur Smiles! Yeah! Pink, fluffy unicorns dancing on rainbows! Pink, fluffy unicorns dancing on rainbows! Pink, fluffy unicorns dancing on rainbows! Pink, fluffy unicorns dancing on rainbows! Pink, fluffy unicorns dancing on rainbows! Pink, fluffy unicorns dancing on rainbows! Pink, fluffy unicorns dancing on rainbows! Pink, fluffy unicorns dancing on, dancing on rainPink, fluffy unicorns dancing on rainbows! Pink, fluffy unicorns dancing on rainbows! Pink, fluffy unicorns dancing on rainbows! Pink, fluffy unicorns dancing on rainbows! Let's test your knowledge and see what you've learned so far! What color are the unicorns? Pink! Where are they dancing? Rainbows! Please use one word to describe the texture of their magical fur Smiles! Yeah! Pink, fluffy unicorns dancing on rainbows! Pink, fluffy unicorns dancing on rainbows! Pink, fluffy unicorns dancing on rainbows! Pink, fluffy unicorns dancing on rainbows! Pink, fluffy unicorns dancing on rainbows! Pink, fluffy unicorns dancing on rainbows! Pink, fluffy unicorns dancing on rainbows! Pink, fluffy unicorns dancing on, dancing on rainPink, fluffy unicorns dancing on rainbows! Pink, fluffy unicorns dancing on rainbows! Pink, fluffy unicorns dancing on rainbows! Pink, fluffy unicorns dancing on rainbows! Let's test your knowledge and see what you've learned so far! What color are the unicorns? Pink! Where are they dancing? Rainbows! Please use one word to describe the texture of their magical fur Smiles! Yeah! Pink, fluffy unicorns dancing on rainbows! Pink, fluffy unicorns dancing on rainbows! Pink, fluffy unicorns dancing on rainbows! Pink, fluffy unicorns dancing on rainbows! Pink, fluffy unicorns dancing on rainbows! Pink, fluffy unicorns dancing on rainbows! Pink, fluffy unicorns dancing on rainbows! Pink, fluffy unicorns dancing on, dancing on rainPink, fluffy unicorns dancing on rainbows! Pink, fluffy unicorns dancing on rainbows! Pink, fluffy unicorns dancing on rainbows! Pink, fluffy unicorns dancing on rainbows! Let's test your knowledge and see what you've learned so far! What color are the unicorns? Pink! Where are they dancing? Rainbows! Please use one word to describe the texture of their magical fur Smiles! Yeah! Pink, fluffy unicorns dancing on rainbows! Pink, fluffy unicorns dancing on rainbows! Pink, fluffy unicorns dancing on rainbows! Pink, fluffy unicorns dancing on rainbows! Pink, fluffy unicorns dancing on rainbows! Pink, fluffy unicorns dancing on rainbows! Pink, fluffy unicorns dancing on rainbows! Pink, fluffy unicorns dancing on, dancing on rainPink, fluffy unicorns dancing on rainbows! Pink, fluffy unicorns dancing on rainbows! Pink, fluffy unicorns dancing on rainbows! Pink, fluffy unicorns dancing on rainbows! Let's test your knowledge and see what you've learned so far! What color are the unicorns? Pink! Where are they dancing? Rainbows! Please use one word to describe the texture of their magical fur Smiles! Yeah! Pink, fluffy unicorns dancing on rainbows! Pink, fluffy unicorns dancing on rainbows! Pink, fluffy unicorns dancing on rainbows! Pink, fluffy unicorns dancing on rainbows! Pink, fluffy unicorns dancing on rainbows! Pink, fluffy unicorns dancing on rainbows! Pink, fluffy unicorns dancing on rainbows! Pink, fluffy unicorns dancing on, dancing on rainPink, fluffy unicorns dancing on rainbows! Pink, fluffy unicorns dancing on rainbows! Pink, fluffy unicorns dancing on rainbows! Pink, fluffy unicorns dancing on rainbows! Let's test your knowledge and see what you've learned so far! What color are the unicorns? Pink! Where are they dancing? Rainbows! Please use one word to describe the texture of their magical fur Smiles! Yeah! Pink, fluffy unicorns dancing on rainbows! Pink, fluffy unicorns dancing on rainbows! Pink, fluffy unicorns dancing on rainbows! Pink, fluffy unicorns dancing on rainbows! Pink, fluffy unicorns dancing on rainbows! Pink, fluffy unicorns dancing on rainbows! Pink, fluffy unicorns dancing on rainbows! Pink, fluffy unicorns dancing on, dancing on rainPink, fluffy unicorns dancing on rainbows! Pink, fluffy unicorns dancing on rainbows! Pink, fluffy unicorns dancing on rainbows! Pink, fluffy unicorns dancing on rainbows! Let's test your knowledge and see what you've learned so far! What color are the unicorns? Pink! Where are they dancing? Rainbows! Please use one word to describe the texture of their magical fur Smiles! Yeah! Pink, fluffy unicorns dancing on rainbows! Pink, fluffy unicorns dancing on rainbows! Pink, fluffy unicorns dancing on rainbows! Pink, fluffy unicorns dancing on rainbows! Pink, fluffy unicorns dancing on rainbows! Pink, fluffy unicorns dancing on rainbows! Pink, fluffy unicorns dancing on rainbows! Pink, fluffy unicorns dancing on, dancing on rainPink, fluffy unicorns dancing on rainbows! Pink, fluffy unicorns dancing on rainbows! Pink, fluffy unicorns dancing on rainbows! Pink, fluffy unicorns dancing on rainbows! Let's test your knowledge and see what you've learned so far! What color are the unicorns? Pink! Where are they dancing? Rainbows! Please use one word to describe the texture of their magical fur Smiles! Yeah! Pink, fluffy unicorns dancing on rainbows! Pink, fluffy unicorns dancing on rainbows! Pink, fluffy unicorns dancing on rainbows! Pink, fluffy unicorns dancing on rainbows! Pink, fluffy unicorns dancing on rainbows! Pink, fluffy unicorns dancing on rainbows! Pink, fluffy unicorns dancing on rainbows! Pink, fluffy unicorns dancing on, dancing on rainPink, fluffy unicorns dancing on rainbows! Pink, fluffy unicorns dancing on rainbows! Pink, fluffy unicorns dancing on rainbows! Pink, fluffy unicorns dancing on rainbows! Let's test your knowledge and see what you've learned so far! What color are the unicorns? Pink! Where are they dancing? Rainbows! Please use one word to describe the texture of their magical fur Smiles! Yeah! Pink, fluffy unicorns dancing on rainbows! Pink, fluffy unicorns dancing on rainbows! Pink, fluffy unicorns dancing on rainbows! Pink, fluffy unicorns dancing on rainbows! Pink, fluffy unicorns dancing on rainbows! Pink, fluffy unicorns dancing on rainbows! Pink, fluffy unicorns dancing on rainbows! Pink, fluffy unicorns dancing on, dancing on rainPink, fluffy unicorns dancing on rainbows! Pink, fluffy unicorns dancing on rainbows! Pink, fluffy unicorns dancing on rainbows! Pink, fluffy unicorns dancing on rainbows! Let's test your knowledge and see what you've learned so far! What color are the unicorns? Pink! Where are they dancing? Rainbows! Please use one word to describe the texture of their magical fur Smiles! Yeah! Pink, fluffy unicorns dancing on rainbows! Pink, fluffy unicorns dancing on rainbows! Pink, fluffy unicorns dancing on rainbows! Pink, fluffy unicorns dancing on rainbows! Pink, fluffy unicorns dancing on rainbows! Pink, fluffy unicorns dancing on rainbows! Pink, fluffy unicorns dancing on rainbows! Pink, fluffy unicorns dancing on, dancing on rainPink, fluffy unicorns dancing on rainbows! Pink, fluffy unicorns dancing on rainbows! Pink, fluffy unicorns dancing on rainbows! Pink, fluffy unicorns dancing on rainbows! Let's test your knowledge and see what you've learned so far! What color are the unicorns? Pink! Where are they dancing? Rainbows! Please use one word to describe the texture of their magical fur Smiles! Yeah! Pink, fluffy unicorns dancing on rainbows! Pink, fluffy unicorns dancing on rainbows! Pink, fluffy unicorns dancing on rainbows! Pink, fluffy unicorns dancing on rainbows! Pink, fluffy unicorns dancing on rainbows! Pink, fluffy unicorns dancing on rainbows! Pink, fluffy unicorns dancing on rainbows! Pink, fluffy unicorns dancing on, dancing on rainPink, fluffy unicorns dancing on rainbows! Pink, fluffy unicorns dancing on rainbows! Pink, fluffy unicorns dancing on rainbows! Pink, fluffy unicorns dancing on rainbows! Let's test your knowledge and see what you've learned so far! What color are the unicorns? Pink! Where are they dancing? Rainbows! Please use one word to describe the texture of their magical fur Smiles! Yeah! Pink, fluffy unicorns dancing on rainbows! Pink, fluffy unicorns dancing on rainbows! Pink, fluffy unicorns dancing on rainbows! Pink, fluffy unicorns dancing on rainbows! Pink, fluffy unicorns dancing on rainbows! Pink, fluffy unicorns dancing on rainbows! Pink, fluffy unicorns dancing on rainbows! Pink, fluffy unicorns dancing on, dancing on rainPink, fluffy unicorns dancing on rainbows! Pink, fluffy unicorns dancing on rainbows! Pink, fluffy unicorns dancing on rainbows! Pink, fluffy unicorns dancing on rainbows! Let's test your knowledge and see what you've learned so far! What color are the unicorns? Pink! Where are they dancing? Rainbows! Please use one word to describe the texture of their magical fur Smiles! Yeah! Pink, fluffy unicorns dancing on rainbows! Pink, fluffy unicorns dancing on rainbows! Pink, fluffy unicorns dancing on rainbows! Pink, fluffy unicorns dancing on rainbows! Pink, fluffy unicorns dancing on rainbows! Pink, fluffy unicorns dancing on rainbows! Pink, fluffy unicorns dancing on rainbows! Pink, fluffy unicorns dancing on, dancing on rainPink, fluffy unicorns dancing on rainbows! Pink, fluffy unicorns dancing on rainbows! Pink, fluffy unicorns dancing on rainbows! Pink, fluffy unicorns dancing on rainbows! Let's test your knowledge and see what you've learned so far! What color are the unicorns? Pink! Where are they dancing? Rainbows! Please use one word to describe the texture of their magical fur Smiles! Yeah! Pink, fluffy unicorns dancing on rainbows! Pink, fluffy unicorns dancing on rainbows! Pink, fluffy unicorns dancing on rainbows! Pink, fluffy unicorns dancing on rainbows! Pink, fluffy unicorns dancing on rainbows! Pink, fluffy unicorns dancing on rainbows! Pink, fluffy unicorns dancing on rainbows! Pink, fluffy unicorns dancing on, dancing on rainPink, fluffy unicorns dancing on rainbows! Pink, fluffy unicorns dancing on rainbows! Pink, fluffy unicorns dancing on rainbows! Pink, fluffy unicorns dancing on rainbows! Let's test your knowledge and see what you've learned so far! What color are the unicorns? Pink! Where are they dancing? Rainbows! Please use one word to describe the texture of their magical fur Smiles! Yeah! Pink, fluffy unicorns dancing on rainbows! Pink, fluffy unicorns dancing on rainbows! Pink, fluffy unicorns dancing on rainbows! Pink, fluffy unicorns dancing on rainbows! Pink, fluffy unicorns dancing on rainbows! Pink, fluffy unicorns dancing on rainbows! Pink, fluffy unicorns dancing on rainbows! Pink, fluffy unicorns dancing on, dancing on rainPink, fluffy unicorns dancing on rainbows! Pink, fluffy unicorns dancing on rainbows! Pink, fluffy unicorns dancing on rainbows! Pink, fluffy unicorns dancing on rainbows! Let's test your knowledge and see what you've learned so far! What color are the unicorns? Pink! Where are they dancing? Rainbows! Please use one word to describe the texture of their magical fur Smiles! Yeah! Pink, fluffy unicorns dancing on rainbows! Pink, fluffy unicorns dancing on rainbows! Pink, fluffy unicorns dancing on rainbows! Pink, fluffy unicorns dancing on rainbows! Pink, fluffy unicorns dancing on rainbows! Pink, fluffy unicorns dancing on rainbows! Pink, fluffy unicorns dancing on rainbows! Pink, fluffy unicorns dancing on, dancing on rainPink, fluffy unicorns dancing on rainbows! Pink, fluffy unicorns dancing on rainbows! Pink, fluffy unicorns dancing on rainbows! Pink, fluffy unicorns dancing on rainbows! Let's test your knowledge and see what you've learned so far! What color are the unicorns? Pink! Where are they dancing? Rainbows! Please use one word to describe the texture of their magical fur Smiles! Yeah! Pink, fluffy unicorns dancing on rainbows! Pink, fluffy unicorns dancing on rainbows! Pink, fluffy unicorns dancing on rainbows! Pink, fluffy unicorns dancing on rainbows! Pink, fluffy unicorns dancing on rainbows! Pink, fluffy unicorns dancing on rainbows! Pink, fluffy unicorns dancing on rainbows! Pink, fluffy unicorns dancing on, dancing on rainPink, fluffy unicorns dancing on rainbows! Pink, fluffy unicorns dancing on rainbows! Pink, fluffy unicorns dancing on rainbows! Pink, fluffy unicorns dancing on rainbows! Let's test your knowledge and see what you've learned so far! What color are the unicorns? Pink! Where are they dancing? Rainbows! Please use one word to describe the texture of their magical fur Smiles! Yeah! Pink, fluffy unicorns dancing on rainbows! Pink, fluffy unicorns dancing on rainbows! Pink, fluffy unicorns dancing on rainbows! Pink, fluffy unicorns dancing on rainbows! Pink, fluffy unicorns dancing on rainbows! Pink, fluffy unicorns dancing on rainbows! Pink, fluffy unicorns dancing on rainbows! Pink, fluffy unicorns dancing on, dancing on rainPink, fluffy unicorns dancing on rainbows! Pink, fluffy unicorns dancing on rainbows! Pink, fluffy unicorns dancing on rainbows! Pink, fluffy unicorns dancing on rainbows! Let's test your knowledge and see what you've learned so far! What color are the unicorns? Pink! Where are they dancing? Rainbows! Please use one word to describe the texture of their magical fur Smiles! Yeah! Pink, fluffy unicorns dancing on rainbows! Pink, fluffy unicorns dancing on rainbows! Pink, fluffy unicorns dancing on rainbows! Pink, fluffy unicorns dancing on rainbows! Pink, fluffy unicorns dancing on rainbows! Pink, fluffy unicorns dancing on rainbows! Pink, fluffy unicorns dancing on rainbows! Pink, fluffy unicorns dancing on, dancing on rainPink, fluffy unicorns dancing on rainbows! Pink, fluffy unicorns dancing on rainbows! Pink, fluffy unicorns dancing on rainbows! Pink, fluffy unicorns dancing on rainbows! Let's test your knowledge and see what you've learned so far! What color are the unicorns? Pink! Where are they dancing? Rainbows! Please use one word to describe the texture of their magical fur Smiles! Yeah! Pink, fluffy unicorns dancing on rainbows! Pink, fluffy unicorns dancing on rainbows! Pink, fluffy unicorns dancing on rainbows! Pink, fluffy unicorns dancing on rainbows! Pink, fluffy unicorns dancing on rainbows! Pink, fluffy unicorns dancing on rainbows! Pink, fluffy unicorns dancing on rainbows! Pink, fluffy unicorns dancing on, dancing on rainPink, fluffy unicorns dancing on rainbows! Pink, fluffy unicorns dancing on rainbows! Pink, fluffy unicorns dancing on rainbows! Pink, fluffy unicorns dancing on rainbows! Let's test your knowledge and see what you've learned so far! What color are the unicorns? Pink! Where are they dancing? Rainbows! Please use one word to describe the texture of their magical fur Smiles! Yeah! Pink, fluffy unicorns dancing on rainbows! Pink, fluffy unicorns dancing on rainbows! Pink, fluffy unicorns dancing on rainbows! Pink, fluffy unicorns dancing on rainbows! Pink, fluffy unicorns dancing on rainbows! Pink, fluffy unicorns dancing on rainbows! Pink, fluffy unicorns dancing on rainbows! Pink, fluffy unicorns dancing on, dancing on rainPink, fluffy unicorns dancing on rainbows! Pink, fluffy unicorns dancing on rainbows! Pink, fluffy unicorns dancing on rainbows! Pink, fluffy unicorns dancing on rainbows! Let's test your knowledge and see what you've learned so far! What color are the unicorns? Pink! Where are they dancing? Rainbows! Please use one word to describe the texture of their magical fur Smiles! Yeah! Pink, fluffy unicorns dancing on rainbows! Pink, fluffy unicorns dancing on rainbows! Pink, fluffy unicorns dancing on rainbows! Pink, fluffy unicorns dancing on rainbows! Pink, fluffy unicorns dancing on rainbows! Pink, fluffy unicorns dancing on rainbows! Pink, fluffy unicorns dancing on rainbows! Pink, fluffy unicorns dancing on, dancing on rainPink, fluffy unicorns dancing on rainbows! Pink, fluffy unicorns dancing on rainbows! Pink, fluffy unicorns dancing on rainbows! Pink, fluffy unicorns dancing on rainbows! Let's test your knowledge and see what you've learned so far! What color are the unicorns? Pink! Where are they dancing? Rainbows! Please use one word to describe the texture of their magical fur Smiles! Yeah! Pink, fluffy unicorns dancing on rainbows! Pink, fluffy unicorns dancing on rainbows! Pink, fluffy unicorns dancing on rainbows! Pink, fluffy unicorns dancing on rainbows! Pink, fluffy unicorns dancing on rainbows! Pink, fluffy unicorns dancing on rainbows! Pink, fluffy unicorns dancing on rainbows! Pink, fluffy unicorns dancing on, dancing on rainPink, fluffy unicorns dancing on rainbows! Pink, fluffy unicorns dancing on rainbows! Pink, fluffy unicorns dancing on rainbows! Pink, fluffy unicorns dancing on rainbows! Let's test your knowledge and see what you've learned so far! What color are the unicorns? Pink! Where are they dancing? Rainbows! Please use one word to describe the texture of their magical fur Smiles! Yeah! Pink, fluffy unicorns dancing on rainbows! Pink, fluffy unicorns dancing on rainbows! Pink, fluffy unicorns dancing on rainbows! Pink, fluffy unicorns dancing on rainbows! Pink, fluffy unicorns dancing on rainbows! Pink, fluffy unicorns dancing on rainbows! Pink, fluffy unicorns dancing on rainbows! Pink, fluffy unicorns dancing on, dancing on rainPink, fluffy unicorns dancing on rainbows! Pink, fluffy unicorns dancing on rainbows! Pink, fluffy unicorns dancing on rainbows! Pink, fluffy unicorns dancing on rainbows! Let's test your knowledge and see what you've learned so far! What color are the unicorns? Pink! Where are they dancing? Rainbows! Please use one word to describe the texture of their magical fur Smiles! Yeah! Pink, fluffy unicorns dancing on rainbows! Pink, fluffy unicorns dancing on rainbows! Pink, fluffy unicorns dancing on rainbows! Pink, fluffy unicorns dancing on rainbows! Pink, fluffy unicorns dancing on rainbows! Pink, fluffy unicorns dancing on rainbows! Pink, fluffy unicorns dancing on rainbows! Pink, fluffy unicorns dancing on, dancing on rainPink, fluffy unicorns dancing on rainbows! Pink, fluffy unicorns dancing on rainbows! Pink, fluffy unicorns dancing on rainbows! Pink, fluffy unicorns dancing on rainbows! Let's test your knowledge and see what you've learned so far! What color are the unicorns? Pink! Where are they dancing? Rainbows! Please use one word to describe the texture of their magical fur Smiles! Yeah! Pink, fluffy unicorns dancing on rainbows! Pink, fluffy unicorns dancing on rainbows! Pink, fluffy unicorns dancing on rainbows! Pink, fluffy unicorns dancing on rainbows! Pink, fluffy unicorns dancing on rainbows! Pink, fluffy unicorns dancing on rainbows! Pink, fluffy unicorns dancing on rainbows! Pink, fluffy unicorns dancing on, dancing on rainPink, fluffy unicorns dancing on rainbows! Pink, fluffy unicorns dancing on rainbows! Pink, fluffy unicorns dancing on rainbows! Pink, fluffy unicorns dancing on rainbows! Let's test your knowledge and see what you've learned so far! What color are the unicorns? Pink! Where are they dancing? Rainbows! Please use one word to describe the texture of their magical fur Smiles! Yeah! Pink, fluffy unicorns dancing on rainbows! Pink, fluffy unicorns dancing on rainbows! Pink, fluffy unicorns dancing on rainbows! Pink, fluffy unicorns dancing on rainbows! Pink, fluffy unicorns dancing on rainbows! Pink, fluffy unicorns dancing on rainbows! Pink, fluffy unicorns dancing on rainbows! Pink, fluffy unicorns dancing on, dancing on rainPink, fluffy unicorns dancing on rainbows! Pink, fluffy unicorns dancing on rainbows! Pink, fluffy unicorns dancing on rainbows! Pink, fluffy unicorns dancing on rainbows! Let's test your knowledge and see what you've learned so far! What color are the unicorns? Pink! Where are they dancing? Rainbows! Please use one word to describe the texture of their magical fur Smiles! Yeah! Pink, fluffy unicorns dancing on rainbows! Pink, fluffy unicorns dancing on rainbows! Pink, fluffy unicorns dancing on rainbows! Pink, fluffy unicorns dancing on rainbows! Pink, fluffy unicorns dancing on rainbows! Pink, fluffy unicorns dancing on rainbows! Pink, fluffy unicorns dancing on rainbows! Pink, fluffy unicorns dancing on, dancing on rainPink, fluffy unicorns dancing on rainbows! Pink, fluffy unicorns dancing on rainbows! Pink, fluffy unicorns dancing on rainbows! Pink, fluffy unicorns dancing on rainbows! Let's test your knowledge and see what you've learned so far! What color are the unicorns? Pink! Where are they dancing? Rainbows! Please use one word to describe the texture of their magical fur Smiles! Yeah! Pink, fluffy unicorns dancing on rainbows! Pink, fluffy unicorns dancing on rainbows! Pink, fluffy unicorns dancing on rainbows! Pink, fluffy unicorns dancing on rainbows! Pink, fluffy unicorns dancing on rainbows! Pink, fluffy unicorns dancing on rainbows! Pink, fluffy unicorns dancing on rainbows! Pink, fluffy unicorns dancing on, dancing on rainPink, fluffy unicorns dancing on rainbows! Pink, fluffy unicorns dancing on rainbows! Pink, fluffy unicorns dancing on rainbows! Pink, fluffy unicorns dancing on rainbows! Let's test your knowledge and see what you've learned so far! What color are the unicorns? Pink! Where are they dancing? Rainbows! Please use one word to describe the texture of their magical fur Smiles! Yeah! Pink, fluffy unicorns dancing on rainbows! Pink, fluffy unicorns dancing on rainbows! Pink, fluffy unicorns dancing on rainbows! Pink, fluffy unicorns dancing on rainbows! Pink, fluffy unicorns dancing on rainbows! Pink, fluffy unicorns dancing on rainbows! Pink, fluffy unicorns dancing on rainbows! Pink, fluffy unicorns dancing on, dancing on rainPink, fluffy unicorns dancing on rainbows! Pink, fluffy unicorns dancing on rainbows! Pink, fluffy unicorns dancing on rainbows! Pink, fluffy unicorns dancing on rainbows! Let's test your knowledge and see what you've learned so far! What color are the unicorns? Pink! Where are they dancing? Rainbows! Please use one word to describe the texture of their magical fur Smiles! Yeah! Pink, fluffy unicorns dancing on rainbows! Pink, fluffy unicorns dancing on rainbows! Pink, fluffy unicorns dancing on rainbows! Pink, fluffy unicorns dancing on rainbows! Pink, fluffy unicorns dancing on rainbows! Pink, fluffy unicorns dancing on rainbows! Pink, fluffy unicorns dancing on rainbows! Pink, fluffy unicorns dancing on, dancing on rainPink, fluffy unicorns dancing on rainbows! Pink, fluffy unicorns dancing on rainbows! Pink, fluffy unicorns dancing on rainbows! Pink, fluffy unicorns dancing on rainbows! Let's test your knowledge and see what you've learned so far! What color are the unicorns? Pink! Where are they dancing? Rainbows! Please use one word to describe the texture of their magical fur Smiles! Yeah! Pink, fluffy unicorns dancing on rainbows! Pink, fluffy unicorns dancing on rainbows! Pink, fluffy unicorns dancing on rainbows! Pink, fluffy unicorns dancing on rainbows! Pink, fluffy unicorns dancing on rainbows! Pink, fluffy unicorns dancing on rainbows! Pink, fluffy unicorns dancing on rainbows! Pink, fluffy unicorns dancing on, dancing on rainPink, fluffy unicorns dancing on rainbows! Pink, fluffy unicorns dancing on rainbows! Pink, fluffy unicorns dancing on rainbows! Pink, fluffy unicorns dancing on rainbows! Let's test your knowledge and see what you've learned so far! What color are the unicorns? Pink! Where are they dancing? Rainbows! Please use one word to describe the texture of their magical fur Smiles! Yeah! Pink, fluffy unicorns dancing on rainbows! Pink, fluffy unicorns dancing on rainbows! Pink, fluffy unicorns dancing on rainbows! Pink, fluffy unicorns dancing on rainbows! Pink, fluffy unicorns dancing on rainbows! Pink, fluffy unicorns dancing on rainbows! Pink, fluffy unicorns dancing on rainbows! Pink, fluffy unicorns dancing on, dancing on rainPink, fluffy unicorns dancing on rainbows! Pink, fluffy unicorns dancing on rainbows! Pink, fluffy unicorns dancing on rainbows! Pink, fluffy unicorns dancing on rainbows! Let's test your knowledge and see what you've learned so far! What color are the unicorns? Pink! Where are they dancing? Rainbows! Please use one word to describe the texture of their magical fur Smiles! Yeah! Pink, fluffy unicorns dancing on rainbows! Pink, fluffy unicorns dancing on rainbows! Pink, fluffy unicorns dancing on rainbows! Pink, fluffy unicorns dancing on rainbows! Pink, fluffy unicorns dancing on rainbows! Pink, fluffy unicorns dancing on rainbows! Pink, fluffy unicorns dancing on rainbows! Pink, fluffy unicorns dancing on, dancing on rainPink, fluffy unicorns dancing on rainbows! Pink, fluffy unicorns dancing on rainbows! Pink, fluffy unicorns dancing on rainbows! Pink, fluffy unicorns dancing on rainbows! Let's test your knowledge and see what you've learned so far! What color are the unicorns? Pink! Where are they dancing? Rainbows! Please use one word to describe the texture of their magical fur Smiles! Yeah! Pink, fluffy unicorns dancing on rainbows! Pink, fluffy unicorns dancing on rainbows! Pink, fluffy unicorns dancing on rainbows! Pink, fluffy unicorns dancing on rainbows! Pink, fluffy unicorns dancing on rainbows! Pink, fluffy unicorns dancing on rainbows! Pink, fluffy unicorns dancing on rainbows! Pink, fluffy unicorns dancing on, dancing on rainPink, fluffy unicorns dancing on rainbows! Pink, fluffy unicorns dancing on rainbows! Pink, fluffy unicorns dancing on rainbows! Pink, fluffy unicorns dancing on rainbows! Let's test your knowledge and see what you've learned so far! What color are the unicorns? Pink! Where are they dancing? Rainbows! Please use one word to describe the texture of their magical fur Smiles! Yeah! Pink, fluffy unicorns dancing on rainbows! Pink, fluffy unicorns dancing on rainbows! Pink, fluffy unicorns dancing on rainbows! Pink, fluffy unicorns dancing on rainbows! Pink, fluffy unicorns dancing on rainbows! Pink, fluffy unicorns dancing on rainbows! Pink, fluffy unicorns dancing on rainbows! Pink, fluffy unicorns dancing on, dancing on rainPink, fluffy unicorns dancing on rainbows! Pink, fluffy unicorns dancing on rainbows! Pink, fluffy unicorns dancing on rainbows! Pink, fluffy unicorns dancing on rainbows! Let's test your knowledge and see what you've learned so far! What color are the unicorns? Pink! Where are they dancing? Rainbows! Please use one word to describe the texture of their magical fur Smiles! Yeah! Pink, fluffy unicorns dancing on rainbows! Pink, fluffy unicorns dancing on rainbows! Pink, fluffy unicorns dancing on rainbows! Pink, fluffy unicorns dancing on rainbows! Pink, fluffy unicorns dancing on rainbows! Pink, fluffy unicorns dancing on rainbows! Pink, fluffy unicorns dancing on rainbows! Pink, fluffy unicorns dancing on, dancing on rainPink, fluffy unicorns dancing on rainbows! Pink, fluffy unicorns dancing on rainbows! Pink, fluffy unicorns dancing on rainbows! Pink, fluffy unicorns dancing on rainbows! Let's test your knowledge and see what you've learned so far! What color are the unicorns? Pink! Where are they dancing? Rainbows! Please use one word to describe the texture of their magical fur Smiles! Yeah! Pink, fluffy unicorns dancing on rainbows! Pink, fluffy unicorns dancing on rainbows! Pink, fluffy unicorns dancing on rainbows! Pink, fluffy unicorns dancing on rainbows! Pink, fluffy unicorns dancing on rainbows! Pink, fluffy unicorns dancing on rainbows! Pink, fluffy unicorns dancing on rainbows! Pink, fluffy unicorns dancing on, dancing on rainPink, fluffy unicorns dancing on rainbows! Pink, fluffy unicorns dancing on rainbows! Pink, fluffy unicorns dancing on rainbows! Pink, fluffy unicorns dancing on rainbows! Let's test your knowledge and see what you've learned so far! What color are the unicorns? Pink! Where are they dancing? Rainbows! Please use one word to describe the texture of their magical fur Smiles! Yeah! Pink, fluffy unicorns dancing on rainbows! Pink, fluffy unicorns dancing on rainbows! Pink, fluffy unicorns dancing on rainbows! Pink, fluffy unicorns dancing on rainbows! Pink, fluffy unicorns dancing on rainbows! Pink, fluffy unicorns dancing on rainbows! Pink, fluffy unicorns dancing on rainbows! Pink, fluffy unicorns dancing on, dancing on rainPink, fluffy unicorns dancing on rainbows! Pink, fluffy unicorns dancing on rainbows! Pink, fluffy unicorns dancing on rainbows! Pink, fluffy unicorns dancing on rainbows! Let's test your knowledge and see what you've learned so far! What color are the unicorns? Pink! Where are they dancing? Rainbows! Please use one word to describe the texture of their magical fur Smiles! Yeah! Pink, fluffy unicorns dancing on rainbows! Pink, fluffy unicorns dancing on rainbows! Pink, fluffy unicorns dancing on rainbows! Pink, fluffy unicorns dancing on rainbows! Pink, fluffy unicorns dancing on rainbows! Pink, fluffy unicorns dancing on rainbows! Pink, fluffy unicorns dancing on rainbows! Pink, fluffy unicorns dancing on, dancing on rainPink, fluffy unicorns dancing on rainbows! Pink, fluffy unicorns dancing on rainbows! Pink, fluffy unicorns dancing on rainbows! Pink, fluffy unicorns dancing on rainbows! Let's test your knowledge and see what you've learned so far! What color are the unicorns? Pink! Where are they dancing? Rainbows! Please use one word to describe the texture of their magical fur Smiles! Yeah! Pink, fluffy unicorns dancing on rainbows! Pink, fluffy unicorns dancing on rainbows! Pink, fluffy unicorns dancing on rainbows! Pink, fluffy unicorns dancing on rainbows! Pink, fluffy unicorns dancing on rainbows! Pink, fluffy unicorns dancing on rainbows! Pink, fluffy unicorns dancing on rainbows! Pink, fluffy unicorns dancing on, dancing on rainPink, fluffy unicorns dancing on rainbows! Pink, fluffy unicorns dancing on rainbows! Pink, fluffy unicorns dancing on rainbows! Pink, fluffy unicorns dancing on rainbows! Let's test your knowledge and see what you've learned so far! What color are the unicorns? Pink! Where are they dancing? Rainbows! Please use one word to describe the texture of their magical fur Smiles! Yeah! Pink, fluffy unicorns dancing on rainbows! Pink, fluffy unicorns dancing on rainbows! Pink, fluffy unicorns dancing on rainbows! Pink, fluffy unicorns dancing on rainbows! Pink, fluffy unicorns dancing on rainbows! Pink, fluffy unicorns dancing on rainbows! Pink, fluffy unicorns dancing on rainbows! Pink, fluffy unicorns dancing on, dancing on rainPink, fluffy unicorns dancing on rainbows! Pink, fluffy unicorns dancing on rainbows! Pink, fluffy unicorns dancing on rainbows! Pink, fluffy unicorns dancing on rainbows! Let's test your knowledge and see what you've learned so far! What color are the unicorns? Pink! Where are they dancing? Rainbows! Please use one word to describe the texture of their magical fur Smiles! Yeah! Pink, fluffy unicorns dancing on rainbows! Pink, fluffy unicorns dancing on rainbows! Pink, fluffy unicorns dancing on rainbows! Pink, fluffy unicorns dancing on rainbows! Pink, fluffy unicorns dancing on rainbows! Pink, fluffy unicorns dancing on rainbows! Pink, fluffy unicorns dancing on rainbows! Pink, fluffy unicorns dancing on, dancing on rainPink, fluffy unicorns dancing on rainbows! Pink, fluffy unicorns dancing on rainbows! Pink, fluffy unicorns dancing on rainbows! Pink, fluffy unicorns dancing on rainbows! Let's test your knowledge and see what you've learned so far! What color are the unicorns? Pink! Where are they dancing? Rainbows! Please use one word to describe the texture of their magical fur Smiles! Yeah! Pink, fluffy unicorns dancing on rainbows! Pink, fluffy unicorns dancing on rainbows! Pink, fluffy unicorns dancing on rainbows! Pink, fluffy unicorns dancing on rainbows! Pink, fluffy unicorns dancing on rainbows! Pink, fluffy unicorns dancing on rainbows! Pink, fluffy unicorns dancing on rainbows! Pink, fluffy unicorns dancing on, dancing on rainPink, fluffy unicorns dancing on rainbows! Pink, fluffy unicorns dancing on rainbows! Pink, fluffy unicorns dancing on rainbows! Pink, fluffy unicorns dancing on rainbows! Let's test your knowledge and see what you've learned so far! What color are the unicorns? Pink! Where are they dancing? Rainbows! Please use one word to describe the texture of their magical fur Smiles! Yeah! Pink, fluffy unicorns dancing on rainbows! Pink, fluffy unicorns dancing on rainbows! Pink, fluffy unicorns dancing on rainbows! Pink, fluffy unicorns dancing on rainbows! Pink, fluffy unicorns dancing on rainbows! Pink, fluffy unicorns dancing on rainbows! Pink, fluffy unicorns dancing on rainbows! Pink, fluffy unicorns dancing on, dancing on rainPink, fluffy unicorns dancing on rainbows! Pink, fluffy unicorns dancing on rainbows! Pink, fluffy unicorns dancing on rainbows! Pink, fluffy unicorns dancing on rainbows! Let's test your knowledge and see what you've learned so far! What color are the unicorns? Pink! Where are they dancing? Rainbows! Please use one word to describe the texture of their magical fur Smiles! Yeah! Pink, fluffy unicorns dancing on rainbows! Pink, fluffy unicorns dancing on rainbows! Pink, fluffy unicorns dancing on rainbows! Pink, fluffy unicorns dancing on rainbows! Pink, fluffy unicorns dancing on rainbows! Pink, fluffy unicorns dancing on rainbows! Pink, fluffy unicorns dancing on rainbows! Pink, fluffy unicorns dancing on, dancing on rainPink, fluffy unicorns dancing on rainbows! Pink, fluffy unicorns dancing on rainbows! Pink, fluffy unicorns dancing on rainbows! Pink, fluffy unicorns dancing on rainbows! Let's test your knowledge and see what you've learned so far! What color are the unicorns? Pink! Where are they dancing? Rainbows! Please use one word to describe the texture of their magical fur Smiles! Yeah! Pink, fluffy unicorns dancing on rainbows! Pink, fluffy unicorns dancing on rainbows! Pink, fluffy unicorns dancing on rainbows! Pink, fluffy unicorns dancing on rainbows! Pink, fluffy unicorns dancing on rainbows! Pink, fluffy unicorns dancing on rainbows! Pink, fluffy unicorns dancing on rainbows! Pink, fluffy unicorns dancing on, dancing on rainPink, fluffy unicorns dancing on rainbows! Pink, fluffy unicorns dancing on rainbows! Pink, fluffy unicorns dancing on rainbows! Pink, fluffy unicorns dancing on rainbows! Let's test your knowledge and see what you've learned so far! What color are the unicorns? Pink! Where are they dancing? Rainbows! Please use one word to describe the texture of their magical fur Smiles! Yeah! Pink, fluffy unicorns dancing on rainbows! Pink, fluffy unicorns dancing on rainbows! Pink, fluffy unicorns dancing on rainbows! Pink, fluffy unicorns dancing on rainbows! Pink, fluffy unicorns dancing on rainbows! Pink, fluffy unicorns dancing on rainbows! Pink, fluffy unicorns dancing on rainbows! Pink, fluffy unicorns dancing on, dancing on rainPink, fluffy unicorns dancing on rainbows! Pink, fluffy unicorns dancing on rainbows! Pink, fluffy unicorns dancing on rainbows! Pink, fluffy unicorns dancing on rainbows! Let's test your knowledge and see what you've learned so far! What color are the unicorns? Pink! Where are they dancing? Rainbows! Please use one word to describe the texture of their magical fur Smiles! Yeah! Pink, fluffy unicorns dancing on rainbows! Pink, fluffy unicorns dancing on rainbows! Pink, fluffy unicorns dancing on rainbows! Pink, fluffy unicorns dancing on rainbows! Pink, fluffy unicorns dancing on rainbows! Pink, fluffy unicorns dancing on rainbows! Pink, fluffy unicorns dancing on rainbows! Pink, fluffy unicorns dancing on, dancing on rainPink, fluffy unicorns dancing on rainbows! Pink, fluffy unicorns dancing on rainbows! Pink, fluffy unicorns dancing on rainbows! Pink, fluffy unicorns dancing on rainbows! Let's test your knowledge and see what you've learned so far! What color are the unicorns? Pink! Where are they dancing? Rainbows! Please use one word to describe the texture of their magical fur Smiles! Yeah! Pink, fluffy unicorns dancing on rainbows! Pink, fluffy unicorns dancing on rainbows! Pink, fluffy unicorns dancing on rainbows! Pink, fluffy unicorns dancing on rainbows! Pink, fluffy unicorns dancing on rainbows! Pink, fluffy unicorns dancing on rainbows! Pink, fluffy unicorns dancing on rainbows! Pink, fluffy unicorns dancing on, dancing on rainPink, fluffy unicorns dancing on rainbows! Pink, fluffy unicorns dancing on rainbows! Pink, fluffy unicorns dancing on rainbows! Pink, fluffy unicorns dancing on rainbows! Let's test your knowledge and see what you've learned so far! What color are the unicorns? Pink! Where are they dancing? Rainbows! Please use one word to describe the texture of their magical fur Smiles! Yeah! Pink, fluffy unicorns dancing on rainbows! Pink, fluffy unicorns dancing on rainbows! Pink, fluffy unicorns dancing on rainbows! Pink, fluffy unicorns dancing on rainbows! Pink, fluffy unicorns dancing on rainbows! Pink, fluffy unicorns dancing on rainbows! Pink, fluffy unicorns dancing on rainbows! Pink, fluffy unicorns dancing on, dancing on rainPink, fluffy unicorns dancing on rainbows! Pink, fluffy unicorns dancing on rainbows! Pink, fluffy unicorns dancing on rainbows! Pink, fluffy unicorns dancing on rainbows! Let's test your knowledge and see what you've learned so far! What color are the unicorns? Pink! Where are they dancing? Rainbows! Please use one word to describe the texture of their magical fur Smiles! Yeah! Pink, fluffy unicorns dancing on rainbows! Pink, fluffy unicorns dancing on rainbows! Pink, fluffy unicorns dancing on rainbows! Pink, fluffy unicorns dancing on rainbows! Pink, fluffy unicorns dancing on rainbows! Pink, fluffy unicorns dancing on rainbows! Pink, fluffy unicorns dancing on rainbows! Pink, fluffy unicorns dancing on, dancing on rainPink, fluffy unicorns dancing on rainbows! Pink, fluffy unicorns dancing on rainbows! Pink, fluffy unicorns dancing on rainbows! Pink, fluffy unicorns dancing on rainbows! Let's test your knowledge and see what you've learned so far! What color are the unicorns? Pink! Where are they dancing? Rainbows! Please use one word to describe the texture of their magical fur Smiles! Yeah! Pink, fluffy unicorns dancing on rainbows! Pink, fluffy unicorns dancing on rainbows! Pink, fluffy unicorns dancing on rainbows! Pink, fluffy unicorns dancing on rainbows! Pink, fluffy unicorns dancing on rainbows! Pink, fluffy unicorns dancing on rainbows! Pink, fluffy unicorns dancing on rainbows! Pink, fluffy unicorns dancing on, dancing on rainPink, fluffy unicorns dancing on rainbows! Pink, fluffy unicorns dancing on rainbows! Pink, fluffy unicorns dancing on rainbows! Pink, fluffy unicorns dancing on rainbows! Let's test your knowledge and see what you've learned so far! What color are the unicorns? Pink! Where are they dancing? Rainbows! Please use one word to describe the texture of their magical fur Smiles! Yeah! Pink, fluffy unicorns dancing on rainbows! Pink, fluffy unicorns dancing on rainbows! Pink, fluffy unicorns dancing on rainbows! Pink, fluffy unicorns dancing on rainbows! Pink, fluffy unicorns dancing on rainbows! Pink, fluffy unicorns dancing on rainbows! Pink, fluffy unicorns dancing on rainbows! Pink, fluffy unicorns dancing on, dancing on rainPink, fluffy unicorns dancing on rainbows! Pink, fluffy unicorns dancing on rainbows! Pink, fluffy unicorns dancing on rainbows! Pink, fluffy unicorns dancing on rainbows! Let's test your knowledge and see what you've learned so far! What color are the unicorns? Pink! Where are they dancing? Rainbows! Please use one word to describe the texture of their magical fur Smiles! Yeah! Pink, fluffy unicorns dancing on rainbows! Pink, fluffy unicorns dancing on rainbows! Pink, fluffy unicorns dancing on rainbows! Pink, fluffy unicorns dancing on rainbows! Pink, fluffy unicorns dancing on rainbows! Pink, fluffy unicorns dancing on rainbows! Pink, fluffy unicorns dancing on rainbows! Pink, fluffy unicorns dancing on, dancing on rainPink, fluffy unicorns dancing on rainbows! Pink, fluffy unicorns dancing on rainbows! Pink, fluffy unicorns dancing on rainbows! Pink, fluffy unicorns dancing on rainbows! Let's test your knowledge and see what you've learned so far! What color are the unicorns? Pink! Where are they dancing? Rainbows! Please use one word to describe the texture of their magical fur Smiles! Yeah! Pink, fluffy unicorns dancing on rainbows! Pink, fluffy unicorns dancing on rainbows! Pink, fluffy unicorns dancing on rainbows! Pink, fluffy unicorns dancing on rainbows! Pink, fluffy unicorns dancing on rainbows! Pink, fluffy unicorns dancing on rainbows! Pink, fluffy unicorns dancing on rainbows! Pink, fluffy unicorns dancing on, dancing on rainPink, fluffy unicorns dancing on rainbows! Pink, fluffy unicorns dancing on rainbows! Pink, fluffy unicorns dancing on rainbows! Pink, fluffy unicorns dancing on rainbows! Let's test your knowledge and see what you've learned so far! What color are the unicorns? Pink! Where are they dancing? Rainbows! Please use one word to describe the texture of their magical fur Smiles! Yeah! Pink, fluffy unicorns dancing on rainbows! Pink, fluffy unicorns dancing on rainbows! Pink, fluffy unicorns dancing on rainbows! Pink, fluffy unicorns dancing on rainbows! Pink, fluffy unicorns dancing on rainbows! Pink, fluffy unicorns dancing on rainbows! Pink, fluffy unicorns dancing on rainbows! Pink, fluffy unicorns dancing on, dancing on rainPink, fluffy unicorns dancing on rainbows! Pink, fluffy unicorns dancing on rainbows! Pink, fluffy unicorns dancing on rainbows! Pink, fluffy unicorns dancing on rainbows! Let's test your knowledge and see what you've learned so far! What color are the unicorns? Pink! Where are they dancing? Rainbows! Please use one word to describe the texture of their magical fur Smiles! Yeah! Pink, fluffy unicorns dancing on rainbows! Pink, fluffy unicorns dancing on rainbows! Pink, fluffy unicorns dancing on rainbows! Pink, fluffy unicorns dancing on rainbows! Pink, fluffy unicorns dancing on rainbows! Pink, fluffy unicorns dancing on rainbows! Pink, fluffy unicorns dancing on rainbows! Pink, fluffy unicorns dancing on, dancing on rainPink, fluffy unicorns dancing on rainbows! Pink, fluffy unicorns dancing on rainbows! Pink, fluffy unicorns dancing on rainbows! Pink, fluffy unicorns dancing on rainbows! Let's test your knowledge and see what you've learned so far! What color are the unicorns? Pink! Where are they dancing? Rainbows! Please use one word to describe the texture of their magical fur Smiles! Yeah! Pink, fluffy unicorns dancing on rainbows! Pink, fluffy unicorns dancing on rainbows! Pink, fluffy unicorns dancing on rainbows! Pink, fluffy unicorns dancing on rainbows! Pink, fluffy unicorns dancing on rainbows! Pink, fluffy unicorns dancing on rainbows! Pink, fluffy unicorns dancing on rainbows! Pink, fluffy unicorns dancing on, dancing on rainPink, fluffy unicorns dancing on rainbows! Pink, fluffy unicorns dancing on rainbows! Pink, fluffy unicorns dancing on rainbows! Pink, fluffy unicorns dancing on rainbows! Let's test your knowledge and see what you've learned so far! What color are the unicorns? Pink! Where are they dancing? Rainbows! Please use one word to describe the texture of their magical fur Smiles! Yeah! Pink, fluffy unicorns dancing on rainbows! Pink, fluffy unicorns dancing on rainbows! Pink, fluffy unicorns dancing on rainbows! Pink, fluffy unicorns dancing on rainbows! Pink, fluffy unicorns dancing on rainbows! Pink, fluffy unicorns dancing on rainbows! Pink, fluffy unicorns dancing on rainbows! Pink, fluffy unicorns dancing on, dancing on rainPink, fluffy unicorns dancing on rainbows! Pink, fluffy unicorns dancing on rainbows! Pink, fluffy unicorns dancing on rainbows! Pink, fluffy unicorns dancing on rainbows! Let's test your knowledge and see what you've learned so far! What color are the unicorns? Pink! Where are they dancing? Rainbows! Please use one word to describe the texture of their magical fur Smiles! Yeah! Pink, fluffy unicorns dancing on rainbows! Pink, fluffy unicorns dancing on rainbows! Pink, fluffy unicorns dancing on rainbows! Pink, fluffy unicorns dancing on rainbows! Pink, fluffy unicorns dancing on rainbows! Pink, fluffy unicorns dancing on rainbows! Pink, fluffy unicorns dancing on rainbows! Pink, fluffy unicorns dancing on, dancing on rainPink, fluffy unicorns dancing on rainbows! Pink, fluffy unicorns dancing on rainbows! Pink, fluffy unicorns dancing on rainbows! Pink, fluffy unicorns dancing on rainbows! Let's test your knowledge and see what you've learned so far! What color are the unicorns? Pink! Where are they dancing? Rainbows! Please use one word to describe the texture of their magical fur Smiles! Yeah! Pink, fluffy unicorns dancing on rainbows! Pink, fluffy unicorns dancing on rainbows! Pink, fluffy unicorns dancing on rainbows! Pink, fluffy unicorns dancing on rainbows! Pink, fluffy unicorns dancing on rainbows! Pink, fluffy unicorns dancing on rainbows! Pink, fluffy unicorns dancing on rainbows! Pink, fluffy unicorns dancing on, dancing on rainPink, fluffy unicorns dancing on rainbows! Pink, fluffy unicorns dancing on rainbows! Pink, fluffy unicorns dancing on rainbows! Pink, fluffy unicorns dancing on rainbows! Let's test your knowledge and see what you've learned so far! What color are the unicorns? Pink! Where are they dancing? Rainbows! Please use one word to describe the texture of their magical fur Smiles! Yeah! Pink, fluffy unicorns dancing on rainbows! Pink, fluffy unicorns dancing on rainbows! Pink, fluffy unicorns dancing on rainbows! Pink, fluffy unicorns dancing on rainbows! Pink, fluffy unicorns dancing on rainbows! Pink, fluffy unicorns dancing on rainbows! Pink, fluffy unicorns dancing on rainbows! Pink, fluffy unicorns dancing on, dancing on rainPink, fluffy unicorns dancing on rainbows! Pink, fluffy unicorns dancing on rainbows! Pink, fluffy unicorns dancing on rainbows! Pink, fluffy unicorns dancing on rainbows! Let's test your knowledge and see what you've learned so far! What color are the unicorns? Pink! Where are they dancing? Rainbows! Please use one word to describe the texture of their magical fur Smiles! Yeah! Pink, fluffy unicorns dancing on rainbows! Pink, fluffy unicorns dancing on rainbows! Pink, fluffy unicorns dancing on rainbows! Pink, fluffy unicorns dancing on rainbows! Pink, fluffy unicorns dancing on rainbows! Pink, fluffy unicorns dancing on rainbows! Pink, fluffy unicorns dancing on rainbows! Pink, fluffy unicorns dancing on, dancing on rainPink, fluffy unicorns dancing on rainbows! Pink, fluffy unicorns dancing on rainbows! Pink, fluffy unicorns dancing on rainbows! Pink, fluffy unicorns dancing on rainbows! Let's test your knowledge and see what you've learned so far! What color are the unicorns? Pink! Where are they dancing? Rainbows! Please use one word to describe the texture of their magical fur Smiles! Yeah! Pink, fluffy unicorns dancing on rainbows! Pink, fluffy unicorns dancing on rainbows! Pink, fluffy unicorns dancing on rainbows! Pink, fluffy unicorns dancing on rainbows! Pink, fluffy unicorns dancing on rainbows! Pink, fluffy unicorns dancing on rainbows! Pink, fluffy unicorns dancing on rainbows! Pink, fluffy unicorns dancing on, dancing on rainPink, fluffy unicorns dancing on rainbows! Pink, fluffy unicorns dancing on rainbows! Pink, fluffy unicorns dancing on rainbows! Pink, fluffy unicorns dancing on rainbows! Let's test your knowledge and see what you've learned so far! What color are the unicorns? Pink! Where are they dancing? Rainbows! Please use one word to describe the texture of their magical fur Smiles! Yeah! Pink, fluffy unicorns dancing on rainbows! Pink, fluffy unicorns dancing on rainbows! Pink, fluffy unicorns dancing on rainbows! Pink, fluffy unicorns dancing on rainbows! Pink, fluffy unicorns dancing on rainbows! Pink, fluffy unicorns dancing on rainbows! Pink, fluffy unicorns dancing on rainbows! Pink, fluffy unicorns dancing on, dancing on rainPink, fluffy unicorns dancing on rainbows! Pink, fluffy unicorns dancing on rainbows! Pink, fluffy unicorns dancing on rainbows! Pink, fluffy unicorns dancing on rainbows! Let's test your knowledge and see what you've learned so far! What color are the unicorns? Pink! Where are they dancing? Rainbows! Please use one word to describe the texture of their magical fur Smiles! Yeah! Pink, fluffy unicorns dancing on rainbows! Pink, fluffy unicorns dancing on rainbows! Pink, fluffy unicorns dancing on rainbows! Pink, fluffy unicorns dancing on rainbows! Pink, fluffy unicorns dancing on rainbows! Pink, fluffy unicorns dancing on rainbows! Pink, fluffy unicorns dancing on rainbows! Pink, fluffy unicorns dancing on, dancing on rainPink, fluffy unicorns dancing on rainbows! Pink, fluffy unicorns dancing on rainbows! Pink, fluffy unicorns dancing on rainbows! Pink, fluffy unicorns dancing on rainbows! Let's test your knowledge and see what you've learned so far! What color are the unicorns? Pink! Where are they dancing? Rainbows! Please use one word to describe the texture of their magical fur Smiles! Yeah! Pink, fluffy unicorns dancing on rainbows! Pink, fluffy unicorns dancing on rainbows! Pink, fluffy unicorns dancing on rainbows! Pink, fluffy unicorns dancing on rainbows! Pink, fluffy unicorns dancing on rainbows! Pink, fluffy unicorns dancing on rainbows! Pink, fluffy unicorns dancing on rainbows! Pink, fluffy unicorns dancing on, dancing on rain
