= Portugal. The Man discography =

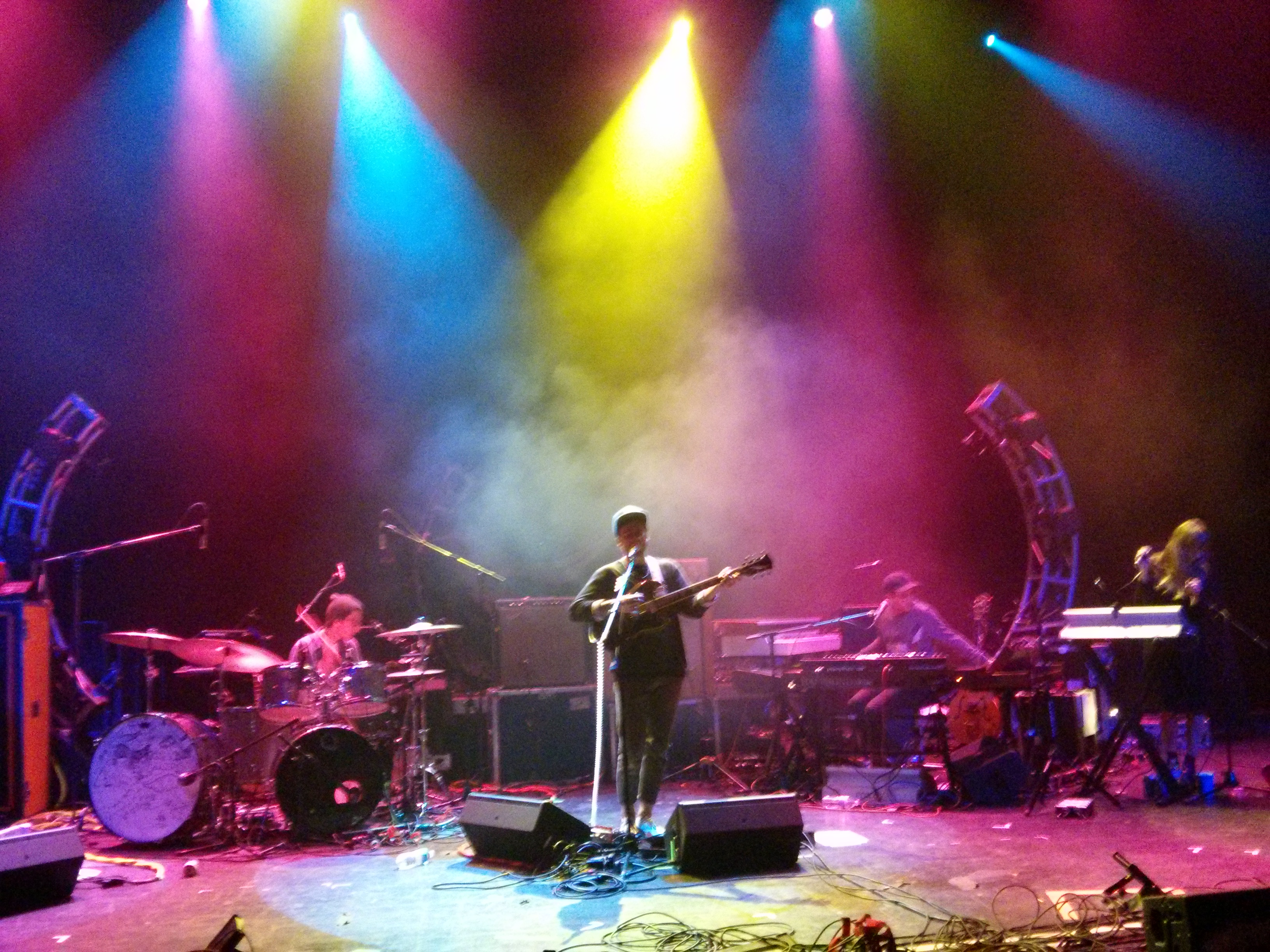
- Portugal. The Man performing in Kansas City in October 2013
- Studio albums: 10
- EPs: 4
- Singles: 15
- Other albums: 1
- Guest appearances: 2

American rock band Portugal. The Man have released ten studio albums, four extended plays (EPs) and 15 singles. The band were formed in 2004 in Wasilla, Alaska and currently consist of John Gourley, Zach Carothers, Kyle O'Quin, Jason Sechrist and Eric Howk.

"Feel It Still" became their first song to enter the Billboard Hot 100, peaking at number four. The song also broke the record for most weeks at number one on the Alternative Songs chart, with twenty weeks. On September 3, 2019, the single was certified five-times platinum by the Recording Industry Association of America (RIAA).

== Studio albums ==
List of studio albums, with selected chart positions
Title	Album details	Peak chart positions										Certifications
Title	Album details	US	AUS	AUT	BEL (FL)	BEL (WA)	CAN	FRA	GER	NED	SWI	Certifications
Waiter: "You Vultures!"	Released: January 24, 2006 (US); Label: Fearless; Formats: CD, LP, digital download	—	—	—	—	—	—	—	—	—	—	
Church Mouth	Released: July 24, 2007 (US); Label: Fearless; Formats: CD, LP, digital download	— (Note: Church Mouth did not enter the US Billboard 200, but peaked at number 30 on the US Heatseekers Albums Chart.)	—	—	—	—	—	—	90	—	—	
Censored Colors	Released: September 16, 2008 (US); Label: Equal Vision; Formats: CD, LP, digital download	— (Note: Censored Colors did not enter the US Billboard 200, but peaked at number 10 on the US Heatseekers Albums Chart.)	—	—	—	—	—	—	—	—	—	
The Satanic Satanist	Released: July 21, 2009 (US); Label: Equal Vision; Formats: CD, LP, digital download	81	—	—	—	—	—	—	68	— (Note: The Satanic Satanist did not enter the Dutch Album Top 100, but peaked at number 16 on the Dutch Alternative Albums chart.)	—	
American Ghetto	Released: March 2, 2010 (US); Label: Equal Vision; Formats: CD, LP, digital download	—	—	—	—	—	—	—	—	—	—	
In the Mountain in the Cloud	Released: July 19, 2011 (US); Label: Atlantic; Formats: CD, LP, digital download	42	—	60	—	—	—	—	97	—	70	
Evil Friends	Released: June 4, 2013 (US); Label: Atlantic; Formats: CD, LP, digital download	28	100	64	—	—	—	93	89	—	74	
Woodstock	Released: June 16, 2017; Label: Atlantic; Formats: CD, LP, digital download	32	— (Note: Woodstock did not enter the Australian ARIA Albums Chart but peaked at number seven on the ARIA Hitseekers Chart.)	47	186	140	32	129	64	178	30	RIAA: Platinum; IFPI AUT: Gold; MC: Platinum; SNEP: Gold
Chris Black Changed My Life	Released: June 23, 2023; Label: Atlantic; Formats: CD, LP, digital download	— (Note: Chris Black Changed My Life did not enter the US Billboard 200, but peaked at number 16 on the Album Sales Chart.)	—	—	—	—	—	— (Note: Chris Black Changed My Life did not enter the France Albums Chart but peaked at number 180 on the French Physical Albums Chart.)	—	—	92	
Shish	Released: November 7, 2025; Label: Thirty Tigers; Formats: CD, LP, cassette, digital download	—	—	—	—	—	—	—	—	—	—	
"—" denotes a recording that did not chart or was not released in that territory.

== Other albums ==
List of albums, with notes
Title	Album details	Notes
The Majestic Majesty	Released: July 21, 2009 (US); Label: Approaching AIRballoons, Equal Vision; Formats: CD, LP, digital download	An acoustic album accompanying The Satanic Satanist.
Oregon City Sessions	Released: April 16, 2021 (US); Label: Approaching AIRballoons; Formats: CD, LP, digital download	A live album recorded in a studio in a Portland, Oregon suburb in December 2008.

== Extended plays ==
List of extended plays
Title	EP details
Under Waves of the Brown Coat	Released: 2005 (US); Label: Fearless; Formats: Digital download
The Pines & the Devil	Released: 2006 (US); Label: Fearless; Formats: 7"
Devil Say I, I Say AIR	Released: July 18, 2006 (US); Label: Fearless; Formats: Digital download
It's Complicated Being a Wizard	Released: February 27, 2007 (US); Label: Approaching AIRballoons, Defiance; Formats: CD, 12"
Ulu Selects Vol #1 (Live)	Released: June 16, 2021 (US); Label: Atlantic; Formats: DL
uLu Selects Vol #2	Released: June 6, 2025 (US); Label: KNIK; Formats: Digital download

== Singles ==
=== As lead artist ===
List of singles, with selected chart positions, showing year released and album name
Title	Year	Peak chart positions										Certifications	Album
Title	Year	US	US Rock	AUS	BEL (FL)	BEL (WA)	CAN	RUS Air.	NLD	SWI	UK	Certifications	Album
"My Mind" / "Seventeen"	2007	—	—	—	—	—	—	—	—	—	—		Church Mouth
"People Say"	2009	—	31	—	—	—	—	—	—	—	—		The Satanic Satanist
"Lovers in Love"	2009	—	—	—	—	—	—	—	—	—	—		The Satanic Satanist
"Got It All (This Can't Be Living Now)"	2011	—	— (Note: "Got It All (This Can't Be Living Now)" did not enter the Hot Rock & Alternative Songs chart, but peaked at number 36 on the Alternative Airplay chart.)	—	—	—	—	—	—	—	—		In the Mountain in the Cloud
"So American"	2011	—	—	—	—	—	—	—	—	—	—		In the Mountain in the Cloud
"Evil Friends"	2013	—	—	—	—	—	—	—	—	—	—		Evil Friends
"Purple, Yellow, Red and Blue"	2013	— (Note: "Purple, Yellow, Red and Blue" did not enter the Billboard Hot 100, but peaked at number eight on the Hot Singles Sales chart.)	— (Note: "Purple, Yellow, Red and Blue" did not enter the Hot Rock & Alternative Songs chart, but peaked at number 27 on the Rock & Alternative Airplay chart.)	—	—	—	—	—	—	—	—		Evil Friends
"Modern Jesus"	2013	—	— (Note: "Modern Jesus" did not enter the Hot Rock & Alternative Songs chart, but peaked at number 45 on the Rock & Alternative Airplay chart.)	—	—	—	—	—	—	—	—		Evil Friends
"Endangered Song (Sumatran Tiger)"	2014	—	—	—	—	—	—	—	—	—	—		Non-album single
"Noise Pollution" (featuring Mary Winstead and Zoe Manville)	2016	—	—	—	—	—	—	—	—	—	—		Woodstock
"Feel It Still"	2017	4	1	5	2	4	8	1	28	7	3	RIAA: 7× Platinum; ARIA: 6× Platinum; BEA: Platinum; BPI: 4× Platinum; IFPI DK: Platinum; IFPI SWI: 2× Platinum; MC: 8× Platinum; SNEP: Diamond	Woodstock
"Live in the Moment"	2017	—	10	—	— (Note: "Live in the Moment" did not enter the Flanders Ultratop 50, but charted as an "extra tip" on the Flanders Ultratip chart.)	— (Note: "Live in the Moment" did not enter the Wallonie Ultratop 50, but peaked at number 25 on the Wallonie Ultratip chart.)	—	—	— (Note: "Live in the Moment" did not enter the Netherlands' Single Top 100 but peaked on the Netherlands' Single Tip Chart at number 23.)	— (Note: "Live in the Moment" did not enter the Swiss Singles chart, but charted at number 12 on the Swiss Airplay chart.)	—	RIAA: Gold; MC: Gold	Woodstock
"Tidal Wave"	2018	—	37	—	—	—	—	—	—	—	—		Woodstock
"Easy Tiger"	2018	—	—	—	—	—	—	—	—	—	—		Woodstock
"Who's Gonna Stop Me" (featuring "Weird Al" Yankovic)	2020	—	—	—	—	—	—	—	—	—	—		Non-album singles
"What, Me Worry?"	2022	—	45	—	—	—	—	—	—	— (Note: "What, Me Worry?" did not enter the Swiss Singles chart, but charted at number 81 on the Swiss Airplay chart.)	—		Non-album singles
"Dummy"	2023	—	— (Note: "Dummy" did not enter the Hot Rock & Alternative Songs chart, but peaked at number nine on the Rock & Alternative Airplay chart.)	—	—	—	—	—	—	—	—		Chris Black Changed My Life
"Champ" (featuring Edgar Winter)	2023	—	—	—	—	—	—	—	—	—	—		Chris Black Changed My Life
"Thunderdome [W.T.A.]" (featuring Black Thought and Natalia Lafourcade)	2023	—	—	—	—	—	—	—	—	—	—		Chris Black Changed My Life
"Summer of Luv" (featuring Unknown Mortal Orchestra)	2023	—	— (Note: "Summer of Luv" did not enter the Hot Rock & Alternative Songs chart, but peaked at number 30 on the Rock & Alternative Airplay chart.)	—	—	—	—	—	—	—	—		Chris Black Changed My Life
"Plastic Island"	2023	—	—	—	—	—	—	—	—	—	—		Chris Black Changed My Life
"Doubt" (Mizmor Version)	2023	—	—	—	—	—	—	—	—	—	—		Chris Black Changed My Life
"Glide" (with Neiked)	2025	—	— (Note: "Glide" did not enter the Hot Rock & Alternative Songs chart, but peaked at number 35 on the Alternative Airplay chart.)	—	—	—	—	1	—	— (Note: "Glide" did not enter the Swiss Singles chart, but charted at number 22 on the Swiss Airplay chart.)	—		Non-album singles
"Denali"	2025	—	—	—	—	—	—	—	—	—	—		Shish
"Tanana" / "Mush"	2025	—	— (Note: "Tanana" did not enter the Hot Rock & Alternative Songs chart, but peaked at number 22 on the Rock & Alternative Airplay chart.)	—	—	—	—	—	—	—	—		Shish
"Tanana" / "Mush"	2025	—	—	—	—	—	—	—	—	—	—		Shish
"Dive Into the Ocean" (with Alok and Zeeba)	2025	—	—	—	—	—	—	3	—	—	—		Non-album singles
"Phoenix" (with Marshmello)	2026	—	—	—	—	—	—	8	—	—	—		Non-album singles
"Some Kind of High" (with Neiked)	2026	—	—	—	—	—	—	–	—	—	—		Non-album singles
"You Can Count on Me"	2026	—	—	—	—	—	—	—	—	—	—		The Wildwood Sessions (Music Inspired by LAIKA’s Wildwood)
"—" denotes a recording that did not chart or was not released in that territory.

=== As featured artist ===
Title	Year	Peak chart positions				Album
Title	Year	US Alt.	US Rock	BEL (WA) Tip	CAN Rock	Album
"Every Step That I Take" (Tom Morello featuring Portugal. The Man and Whethan)	2018	18	43	45	32	The Atlas Underground
"The Feels" (Kemba featuring Portugal. The Man)	2019	—	—	—	—	Gilda
"Call Me" (Cherry Glazerr featuring Portugal. The Man)	2019	—	—	—	—	Non-album single
"Milkshake" (St Francis Hotel featuring Portugal. The Man)	2020	—	—	—	—	We Fall Together
"Wind of Change" (Awolnation featuring Portugal. The Man and Brandon Boyd)	2022	—	—	—	—	My Echo, My Shadow, My Covers
"—" denotes a recording that did not chart or was not released in that territory.

== Other charted songs ==
Title	Year	Peak chart positions					Album
Title	Year	CIS	LTU Air	MEX Eng.	RUS Air	UKR	Album
"Feel It Still" (Ofenbach remix)	2017	53	—	—	43	—	Feel It Still (The Remixes)
"We Can Hide Out" (with Ofenbach)	2019	—	—	11	—	—	Ofenbach
"Time's a Fantasy" (Anyma remix) (featuring Jeff Bhasker)	2024	—	52	—	—	105	Chris Black Changed My Life
"—" denotes a recording that did not chart or was not released in that territory.

== Guest appearances ==
List of non-single guest appearances, with other performing artists, showing year released and album name
Title	Year	Other artist(s)	Album
"Oh Boy"	2013	—N/a	Red Bull "Stratos" Documentary
"Heavy Games"	2014	—N/a	The Walking Dead: AMC Original Soundtrack, Vol. 2
"Lass Sie Gehen"	2017	Casper, Ahzumjot	Lang lebe der Tod
"Crown"	2018	Flatbush Zombies	Vacation in Hell
"We Can Hide Out"	2019	Ofenbach	Ofenbach
"Don't Tread on Me"	2021	Aaron Beam	The Metallica Blacklist
"When the Light Goes"	2024	Marcin	Dragon in Harmony
