= The Pines & the Devil =

EP by Portugal. The Man
- Released: 2006
- Genres: Experimental rock; indie rock
- Length: 5:42
- Label: Fearless

Portugal. The Man chronology
The Pines & the Devil (2006)	Devil Say I, I Say AIR (2006)

The Pines & the Devil is a 7-inch vinyl EP from Portugal. The Man. It was put out right after Waiter: "You Vultures!" and includes two new songs that were later added to the digital EP Devil Say I, I Say AIR.

== Track listing ==
1. "The Pines" – 3:13
2. "The Devil" – 2:29

== Personnel ==
- John Baldwin Gourley – lead vocals, guitar, keyboards
- Zachary Scott Carothers – bass, backing vocals, percussion
- Jason Sechrist – drums
