= Eric Howk =

American musician (born 1982)

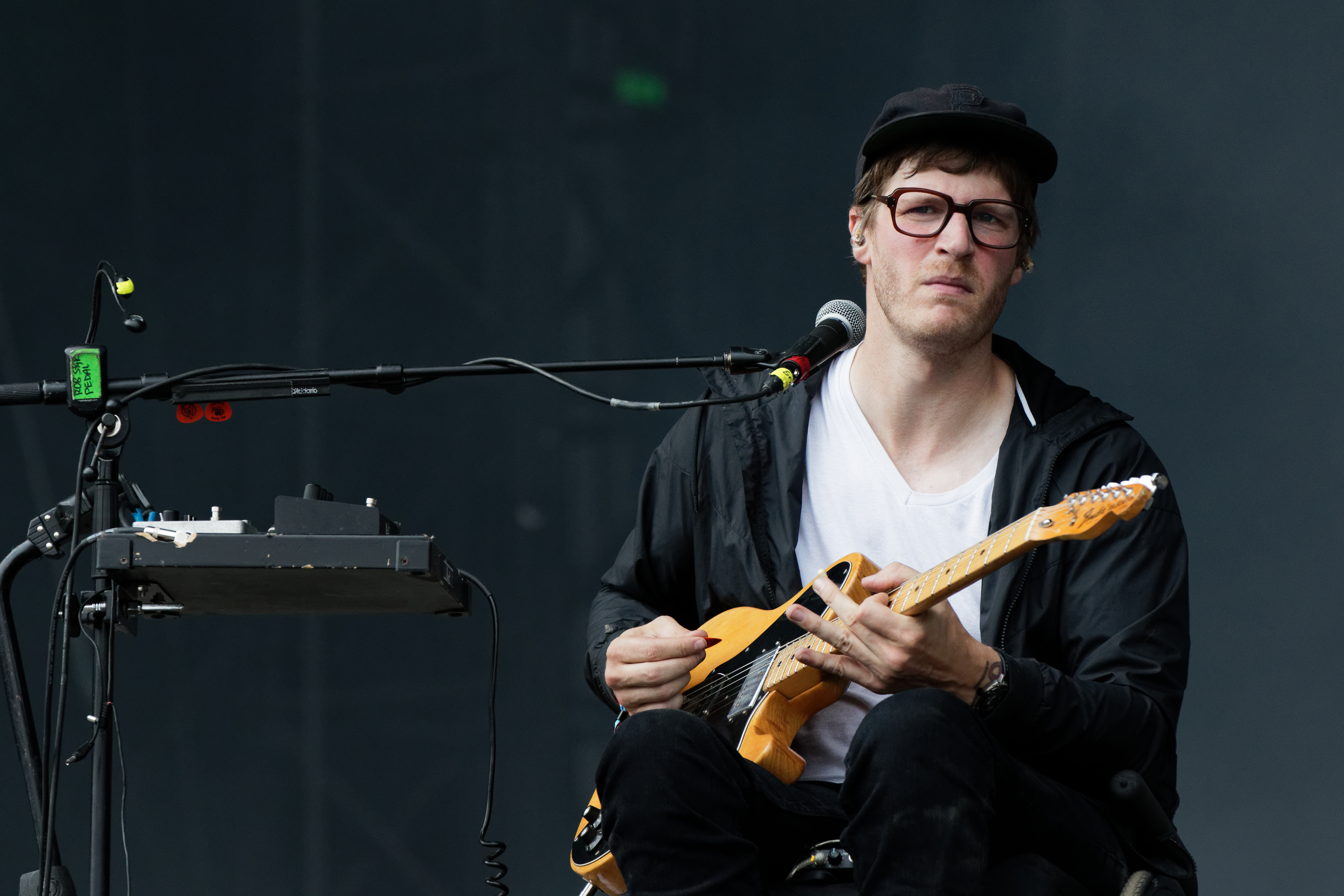

Background information
- Born: Eric Andrew Howk; 1982 (age 43–44); Wasilla, Alaska, U.S.
- Genres: Rock music
- Occupation: Musician
- Instruments: Guitar, vocals
- Years active: 2000 – present
- Formerly of: The Lashes, Portugal. The Man

Eric Andrew Howk (born 1982) is an American musician. He is known for being in the rock band Portugal. The Man.

== Early life and education ==
Eric Andrew Howk was born in Wasilla, Alaska. He attended Snowshoe Elementary, Wasilla Middle School and Wasilla High School.

Howk met bandmates John Gourley and Zach Carothers in elementary and middle school, respectively.

His first band was a punk band he formed with Carothers in high school. In 2000, when he was eighteen, he moved to Seattle, Washington, and played in local bands, including The Lashes.

== Accident ==
In early 2007, he had plans to join Portugal. The Man, but on May 5, 2007, when Howk was twenty-five, he fell into a twelve-foot hole near his friend's house during a Cinco de Mayo party. Howk said in a 2024 interview: "I was sitting on a little retaining wall. The wall goes back. I try to catch myself in, like, the laurel bush behind me. And then that went down. And then I fell into a hole. No one else knew it was there when to catch myself and I just landed really bad."

His T4 vertebrae went through his spinal column, breaking his spinal column; he had an eight-hour surgery, but ultimately was left paralysed from the waist down. A May 2007 benefit concert at the McLeod Residence, a Seattle art cooperative and gallery, helped raise money for his medical bills.

== Career ==
Howk returned to music after recovering a few months later in September 2007, remaining in the Lashes, but turning down the opportunity to join Portugal. The Man, and continued to perform in a wheelchair, until the band became inactive a year later. In 2015, he finally became a member of Portugal. The Man eight years after he had previously planned on joining.

Howk left Portugal. The Man in 2025, with Gourley stating in an interview that he had been suffering with shoulder problems for a number of years and he had recently suffered a fall at Kyle O'Quin's house.

In 2025, Howk released his debut solo album, Skyking.

== Personal life ==
Howk lives in Seattle with his partner, Kassandra, who he married in August 2021.

Howk co-managed The Crocodile, a music venue in Seattle he was still involved with as of 2021, and would stick to playing just local gigs on the weekends. He co-opened The Forge bar in 2011.

Howk began abusing cocaine and alcohol to deal with the pains he suffered from as a paraplegic, which only got worse during the pandemic, but as of 2021, he was sober after attending rehabilitation.

== See also ==
- List of musicians from Seattle
- List of guitarists
- List of people from Alaska
