= Woodstock (Portugal. The Man album) =

2017 album

Studio album by Portugal. The Man
- Released: June 16, 2017
- Recorded: July 2013 – April 2017
- Genre: Pop
- Length: 38:35
- Label: Atlantic
- Producers: Casey Bates; Danger Mouse; Sonny DiPerri; John Gourley; Mikey Hart; John Hill; Nick Koenig; Mike D; Rallier; Stint; Asa Taccone

Portugal. The Man chronology
Evil Friends (2013)	Woodstock (2017)	Chris Black Changed My Life (2023)

Singles from Woodstock
- 1. "Noise Pollution" Released: December 1, 2016; 2. "Feel It Still" Released: March 3, 2017; 3. "Live in the Moment" Released: October 30, 2017; 4. "Tidal Wave" Released: July 17, 2018; 5. "Easy Tiger" Released: December 14, 2018

Professional ratings
Aggregate scores
Source	Rating
AnyDecentMusic?	6.9/10
Metacritic	70/100
Review scores
Source	Rating
AllMusic	3.5/5 stars
The A.V. Club	C+
Mojo	3/5 stars
Paste	7.6/10
Pitchfork	6.6/10
PopMatters	8/10
Slant Magazine	2.5/5 stars

Woodstock is the eighth studio album by American rock band Portugal. The Man, released on June 16, 2017 through Atlantic Records.

== Background and recording ==
After having released Evil Friends in 2013, Portugal. The Man began work on a new project, under the working title Gloomin + Doomin. This album was eventually shelved, partly due to a conversation between John Gourley and his father and the discovery of a lost ticket stub from the Woodstock festival. Work began on the Woodstock album shortly thereafter, involving new music as well as material from the Gloomin + Doomin era. In 2014, the band often uploaded to their Instagram account while working on the album.

== Promotion ==
On December 1, 2016, the band released a single and accompanying music video for the track "Noise Pollution". The music video was directed by Michael Ragen, and shot on location in Alaska. The label did not release nor promote this song to radio.

"Feel It Still" was released as the lead single from the album on March 3, 2017. It reached number four on the Billboard Hot 100, becoming their first entry on the chart. The song peaked at number one on the Billboard Adult Alternative Songs chart, becoming the band's first chart-topper; as well as number one on the Alternative Songs chart, and is their first top ten on either chart.

On April 28, 2017, "Number One" was released as a pre release buzz track from Woodstock, along with an official announcement and pre-orders for the album.

"Live in the Moment" was announced to be the follow-up radio single to "Feel It Still" by Atlantic Records GM David Saslow in an interview with Sirius XM. It was sent to triple-A radio October 30, 2017, and later to alternative radio in November. The song peaked at number one on the Billboard Adult Alternative Songs chart and the Alternative Songs chart. It is their second Alternative Songs number one hit. The song was also released as part of the soundtrack of FIFA 18, the video game by EA Sports.

The album artwork features a burning Rolls-Royce, a photo that was taken by Josh Welch, a friend of the band, in 2014, when he was driving by with his family from Los Angeles to Disneyland, and was later licensed by the band.

== Track listing ==
Woodstock track listing
No.	Title	Writer(s)	Producer(s)	Length
1.	"Number One" (featuring Richie Havens and Son Little)	Portugal. The Man; Brian Burton; Jason Kreher; Casper; Richie Havens	Danger Mouse; Rallier; Mike D^{[a]}; Casey Bates^{[a]}	5:21
2.	"Easy Tiger"	Portugal. The Man; John Hill; Thomas EP Hull; Ajay Bhattacharyya; Ammar Malik; Mikey Hart	Hill; Stint; Mike D^{[a]}; Hart^{[a]}	3:37
3.	"Live in the Moment"	Portugal. The Man; Hill; Malik	Hill; Rallier^{[a]}	4:06
4.	"Feel It Still"	Portugal. The Man; Asa Taccone; Hill; Robert Bateman; Frederick Gorman; Brian Holland	Hill; Taccone	2:42
5.	"Rich Friends"	Portugal. The Man; Hill; Malik; Carla Azar; Eugene Goreshter; Greg Edwards	Hill; Bates^{[a]}	3:41
6.	"Keep On"	Portugal. The Man; Taccone	Taccone; Sonny DiPerri^{[a]}	3:23
7.	"So Young"	Portugal. The Man; Burton; Kreher	Danger Mouse	4:06
8.	"Mr. Lonely" (featuring Fat Lip)	Portugal. The Man; Burton; Derrick Stewart	Danger Mouse; Bates^{[a]}	4:22
9.	"Tidal Wave"	Portugal. The Man; Hill; Bhattacharyya; Nick Koenig; Malik	Hill; Stint	3:31
10.	"Noise Pollution" (version A, vocal mix 1.3; featuring Mary Elizabeth Winstead and Zoe Manville)	Portugal. The Man	Mike D; John Gourley	3:45
Total length:				38:35

Notes

- ^{^[a]} signifies an additional producer.

== Personnel ==
Portugal. The Man

- John Gourley – guitar, vocals
- Zachary Carothers – bass guitar, backing vocals
- Kyle O'Quin – guitar, keyboards, backing vocals, synthesizer
- Eric Howk – guitar
- Jason Sechrist – drums
- Zoe Manville – backing vocals

Additional musicians

- Richie Havens – featured musician
- Son Little – featured musician
- ASAP Rocky – additional vocals (track 7)
- Fat Lip – featured musician
- Mary Elizabeth Winstead – featured musician
- Dave Palmer – keyboards (tracks 2, 3, 4, 5 and 9)
- Kane Ritchotte – drums (track 3)
- Mike Van Gorder – additional vocals

Technical

- John Hill – production
- Brian Burton – production
- Mike D – production
- Ammar Malik – production
- Asa Taccone – production
- Ajay Bhattacharyya – production
- Nick Koenig – production
- Casey Bates – engineering
- Jeff Jackson – engineering
- Robin Florent – engineering
- Rob Cohen – engineering
- Manny Marroquin – mixing
- Chris Galland – mixing
- Emerson Mancini – mastering
- Josh Welch – photography

== Charts ==
=== Weekly charts ===
Chart (2017–2018)	Peak position
Australian Hitseekers Albums (ARIA)	12
Austrian Albums (Ö3 Austria)	47
Belgian Albums (Ultratop Flanders)	186
Belgian Albums (Ultratop Wallonia)	140
Canadian Albums (Billboard)	32
French Albums (SNEP)	154
German Albums (Offizielle Top 100)	64
Hungarian Albums (MAHASZ)	26
Latvian Albums (LaIPA)	58
New Zealand Heatseeker Albums (RMNZ)	6
Swiss Albums (Schweizer Hitparade)	30
UK Album Downloads (Official Charts)	68
US Billboard 200	32
US Top Alternative Albums (Billboard)	3
US Top Rock Albums (Billboard)	3

=== Year-end charts ===
Chart (2017)	Position
US Billboard 200	162
US Top Rock Albums (Billboard)	24

Chart (2018)	Position
US Billboard 200	137
US Top Rock Albums (Billboard)	16

== Certifications ==
Region	Certification	Certified units/sales
Austria (IFPI Austria)	Gold	7,500^{‡}
Canada (Music Canada)	Platinum	80,000^{‡}
France (SNEP)	Gold	50,000^{‡}
United States (RIAA)	Platinum	1,000,000^{‡}
^{‡} Sales+streaming figures based on certification alone.
