= In the Mountain in the Cloud =

Studio album by Portugal. The Man
- Released: July 19, 2011
- Recorded: Summer 2010 – March 2011
- Studios: LA Bronz; Kingsize Soundlabs; White House Recorders; Rusty Branson's Pleasure Cave; Sonic Ranch Studios
- Genres: Psychedelic rock; progressive rock; glam rock; art rock
- Length: 44:00
- Label: Atlantic
- Producers: John Hill, John Gourley, Casey Bates

Portugal. The Man chronology
American Ghetto (2010)	In the Mountain in the Cloud (2011)	Evil Friends (2013)

Singles from In the Mountain in the Cloud
- 1. "Got It All (This Can't Be Living Now)" Released: May 17, 2011; 2. "So American" Released: October 7, 2011

In the Mountain in the Cloud is the sixth studio album by American rock band Portugal. The Man. It was recorded over a period of eight months, and produced by John Hill, the band's frontman John Gourley, and Casey Bates. The album was released on July 19, 2011 through Atlantic Records and is Portugal. The Man's major-label debut.

The album was promoted by the singles "Got It All (This Can't Be Living Now)" and "So American". It received favorable reviews from music critics, and charted in the US, Austria, Germany and Switzerland.

== Background and recording ==
In the Mountain in the Cloud is Portugal. The Man's major-label debut, as the band was signed to Atlantic Records in April 2010, shortly after the release of its fifth studio album American Ghetto, the creation of which took only 10 days.

Portugal. The Man started the relationship with the label by lying that the songs for the sixth studio album were ready. As the band had a more "generous" timeline than in the past, they went to Seattle to work on some songs, and came out with only one. Then they joined producer John Hill in a studio in El Paso, where they managed to write one song, "Floating (Time Isn't Working My Side)". The band members noticed that for the first time they weren't able to communicate, and decided they needed some space to regroup. Hill and singer/songwriter John Gourley went to New York, while other members of the band returned to Portland. Gourley would call them to say what he needed, and they would record and e-mail, however, the distance complicated communication even further. In a midway of the creative process, Gourley said to Hill during an argument that he was going to quit the band and "go back to Alaska and build houses."

In an interview with MTV News, Gourley said that the band "wrote the album, did pre-production and then everything fell apart." The band would go into the studio, "mess everything up," leave the studio to go on tour, and then try again. "All Your Light (Times Like These)" was written in San Diego, "Head Is a Flame (Cool With It)" – in Los Angeles, and "Sleep Forever" was written in Seattle, where the band worked with an old friend, producer Casey Bates. After several months of struggle the record started to take shape. The recording of In the Mountain in the Cloud was wrapped in March 2011, after eight months.

== Release ==
The release of the album was announced on April 29, 2011, with an official release date of July 19, 2011.

On May 17, 2011, four versions of pre-order packs were made available, all with an immediate download of the song "Got It All (This Can't Be Living Now)". "Just the Music" pack consisted of a deluxe edition CD, a vinyl or digital download. In addition to the CD, white vinyl or digital download, "Deluxe Pack" also had a T-shirt, while "Premium Pack" included a T-shirt, a set of three Field Journals and two patches. A "Limited Edition Pack", consisting of a specially packaged CD and white vinyl, digital download, T-shirt, lithograph and the set of three Field Journals and two patches, was also released in a number of 500 copies.

== Promotion and short film ==
Starting April 7, 2011, Portugal. The Man started posting new music via their YouTube account.

- "Once Was One" (April 7, 2011) - 30-Second Preview
- "All Your Light" (April 14, 2011) - 30-Second Preview
- "So American" (April 21, 2011) - 30-Second Preview
- "You Carried Us (Share With Me The Sun)" (April 26, 2011) - 30-Second Preview
- "Got it All (This Can't Be Living Now)" (April 29, 2011) - Full Stream
- "Sleep Forever" (May 5, 2011) - Full Stream

On May 27, 2011, Portugal. The Man posted these samples for streaming via SoundCloud.

On June 6, 2011, Portugal. The Man released a short film entitled "Sleep Forever" via IFC. The film acted as an extended music video for the songs "Sleep Forever" and "Got It All (This Can't Be Living Now)". The film depicted frontman John Baldwin Gourley on a dog-sled, riding through the Alaskan wilderness. At one point, the dogs go missing and John runs off to look for them. He trips in the snow and his gun discharges and kills him. While lying in the snow, one of his missing dogs starts to eat John while he sings "Got It All". During that song, the scene switches from the dog eating John and him singing in an igloo behind a fire. Then, the camera sets on a mountain side with three strange lights and ends. A bit of the footage was originally shown in the 30-second previews for "Once Was One", "All Your Light (Times Like These)", "So American" and "You Carried Us (Share With Me The Sun)".

At one point, before the album was released, you could purchase Portugal. The Man iPhone cases.

The artwork for the Deluxe edition of the album is a fold-out layout, the same as their 2009 album The Satanic Satanist.

"Got It All (This Can't Be Living Now)" is on the soundtrack for 2011 video game FIFA 12.

"All Your Light" is featured in a 2015 Gatorade commercial featuring NBA player Jabari Parker. The song is also featured in Red Bull's 2015 BMX video Kaleidoscope featuring Red Bull sponsored athlete Kriss Kyle.

== Critical reception ==
Professional ratings
Aggregate scores
Source	Rating
Metacritic	73/100
Review scores
Source	Rating
AllMusic	4/5 stars
Alternative Press	7/10 stars
Blare	3.5/5 stars
Consequence of Sound	C+
Cinema Blend	4/5 stars
Entertainment Weekly	7/10 stars
Paste Magazine	(8.3/10)
Spin	6/10 stars
Rolling Stone	3.5/5 stars
Under the Gun Review	9/10

The album has gathered generally favorable reviews from music critics. At Metacritic, which assigns a normalized rating out of 100 to reviews from mainstream critics, the album received an average score of 73, based on 13 reviews.

== Track listing ==
All tracks are written by John Baldwin Gourley.

No.	Title	Length
1.	"So American"	3:36
2.	"Floating (Time Isn't Working My Side)"	3:36
3.	"Got It All (This Can't Be Living Now)"	3:46
4.	"Senseless"	3:26
5.	"Head Is a Flame (Cool with It)"	3:33
6.	"You Carried Us (Share with Me the Sun)"	4:07
7.	"Everything You See (Kids Count Hallelujahs)"	4:15
8.	"All Your Light (Times Like These)"	4:26
9.	"Once Was One"	4:22
10.	"Share with Me the Sun"	2:44
11.	"Sleep Forever"	6:19

== Personnel ==
Portugal. The Man

- John Baldwin Gourley – vocals, guitar, synth
- Zachary Scott Carothers – bass, percussion, vocals
- Ryan Neighbors – piano, Rhodes, organ, synth, Farfisa, vocals
- Jason Sechrist – drums, vocals

Additional musicians

- Philip Peterson – strings, horns, Arranging
- Steven Nistor – additional drums
- Sonny DiPerri – additional drums

Recorded at LA Bronz (Los Angeles), Kingsize Soundlabs (Los Angeles), White House Recorders (San Diego, CA), Rusty Branson's Pleasure Cave (New York City), Sonic Ranch Studios (Texas).

Mastered at Sterling Sound (New York City).

Technical personnel

- John Hill – production
- John Gourley – co-production, design, photography
- Casey Bates – co-production, engineering
- Andy Wallace – mixing
- Paul Suarez – digital editing
- John Morrical – engineering, editing
- Michael Freyer – engineering
- Alex Leader – engineering
- Shaun Cornell – engineering
- Ben Hasdovic – engineering
- Sonny DiPerri – engineering, engineering assistant
- Manuel Calderon – engineering assistant
- Greg Calbi – mastering
- Austin Sellers – design
- Zach Carothers – photography

== Charts ==
Chart (2011)	Peak position
Austrian Albums (Ö3 Austria)	60
German Albums (Offizielle Top 100)	97
Swiss Albums (Schweizer Hitparade)	70
US Billboard 200	42
US Top Alternative Albums (Billboard)	11
US Top Rock Albums (Billboard)	12
