= Church Mouth =

Studio album by Portugal. The Man
- Released: July 20, 2007 (Europe); July 24, 2007 (USA/UK)
- Genres: Blues rock; experimental rock
- Length: 43:02
- Label: Fearless
- Producer: Casey Bates

Portugal. The Man chronology
Waiter: "You Vultures!" (2006)	Church Mouth (2007)	Censored Colors (2008)

Professional ratings
Review scores
Source	Rating
Allmusic	3.5/5 stars
AbsolutePunk.net	(83%)
Music Box	3/5 stars

Church Mouth is the second studio album by American rock band Portugal. The Man. It was released on July 20, 2007 in Europe and on July 24, 2007 in the UK and the USA. As of June 22, 2007, the album had leaked to p2p networks. Regarding the leak, the band posted the following message on their MySpace bulletins:

"Go download it. Give yourself the tastes. Feel free."

== Track listing ==
All tracks are written by John Baldwin Gourley.

No.	Title	Length
1.	"Church Mouth"	3:13
2.	"Sugar Cinnamon"	3:04
3.	"Telling Tellers Tell Me"	3:10
4.	"My Mind"	3:50
5.	"Shade"	3:58
6.	"Dawn"	3:17
7.	"Oh Lord"	3:23
8.	"Bellies Are Full"	4:08
9.	"Children"	5:03
10.	"The Bottom"	3:46
11.	"Sleeping Sleepers Sleep"	3:59
12.	"Sun Brother" (Excerpt)	2:11

Vinyl version
No.	Title	Length
12.	"Sun Brother" (Full version)	5:30
13.	"Seventeen"	3:48

- A limited edition of the album was released exclusively in Germany. It featured the It's Complicated Being a Wizard EP as a bonus disc.

== Charts ==
Chart performance for Church Mouth
Chart (2007)	Peak position
German Albums (Offizielle Top 100)	90

== Personnel ==
Portugal. The Man

- John Baldwin Gourley – guitars, lead vocals, synthesizers, programming
- Zachary Scott Carothers – bass, backing vocals, percussion
- Jason Sechrist – drums, backing vocals, congas, percussion

Additional personnel

- Casey Bates – production, guitar, backing vocals, percussion
- Kirk Huffman – guitar, percussion
- Dewey Halpaus – backing vocals
- Phillip Peterson – cello, backing vocals
- Kyle O'Quin – keyboards, percussion
- Thomas Hunter – percussion
