= American Ghetto =

Studio album by Portugal. The Man
- Released: March 2, 2010
- Genres: Psychedelic rock; electronic rock
- Length: 36:07
- Label: Equal Vision

Portugal. The Man chronology
The Satanic Satanist (2009)	American Ghetto (2010)	In the Mountain in the Cloud (2011)

Professional ratings
Review scores
Source	Rating
AllMusic	4/5 stars
Alter the Press!	4/5 stars
Positivexposure	6/6 stars
The Tune	(4.1/5)

American Ghetto is the fifth studio album by American rock band Portugal. The Man, released in March 2010 to coincide with the band's North American tour. The CD version is limited to 15,000 copies.

American Ghetto was created in just 10 days. The album cover features a picture of lead singer John Gourley's dad's barn, coinciding with the hometown theme of the album. In an interview with Rolling Stone magazine, the band said that "It's about places we used to go growing up – it's kind of a fun record in that way."

== Track listing ==
All tracks are written by John Baldwin Gourley.

No.	Title	Length
1.	"The Dead Dog"	3:14
2.	"Break"	0:58
3.	"60 Years"	4:13
4.	"All My People"	3:12
5.	"1000 Years"	2:52
6.	"Fantastic Pace"	3:42
7.	"The Pushers Party"	4:23
8.	"Do What We Do"	3:27
9.	"Just a Fool"	3:05
10.	"Some Men"	3:31
11.	"When the War Ends"	3:30
Total length:		36:07

== Personnel ==
- John Baldwin Gourley – vocals, guitar
- Jason Sechrist – drums
- Ryan Neighbors – keyboard, vocals
- Zachary Scott Carothers – bass, vocals
- Zoe Manville – vocals
- Ian Shaw – backing vocals
- Bella Nobu – roadie, kazoo

== Release history ==
Region	Date	Format
United States	March 2, 2010	Digital download
United States	May 11, 2010	CD, LP
