= McLeod Residence =

Art cooperative and gallery

Coordinates: 47°36′48″N 122°20′42″W

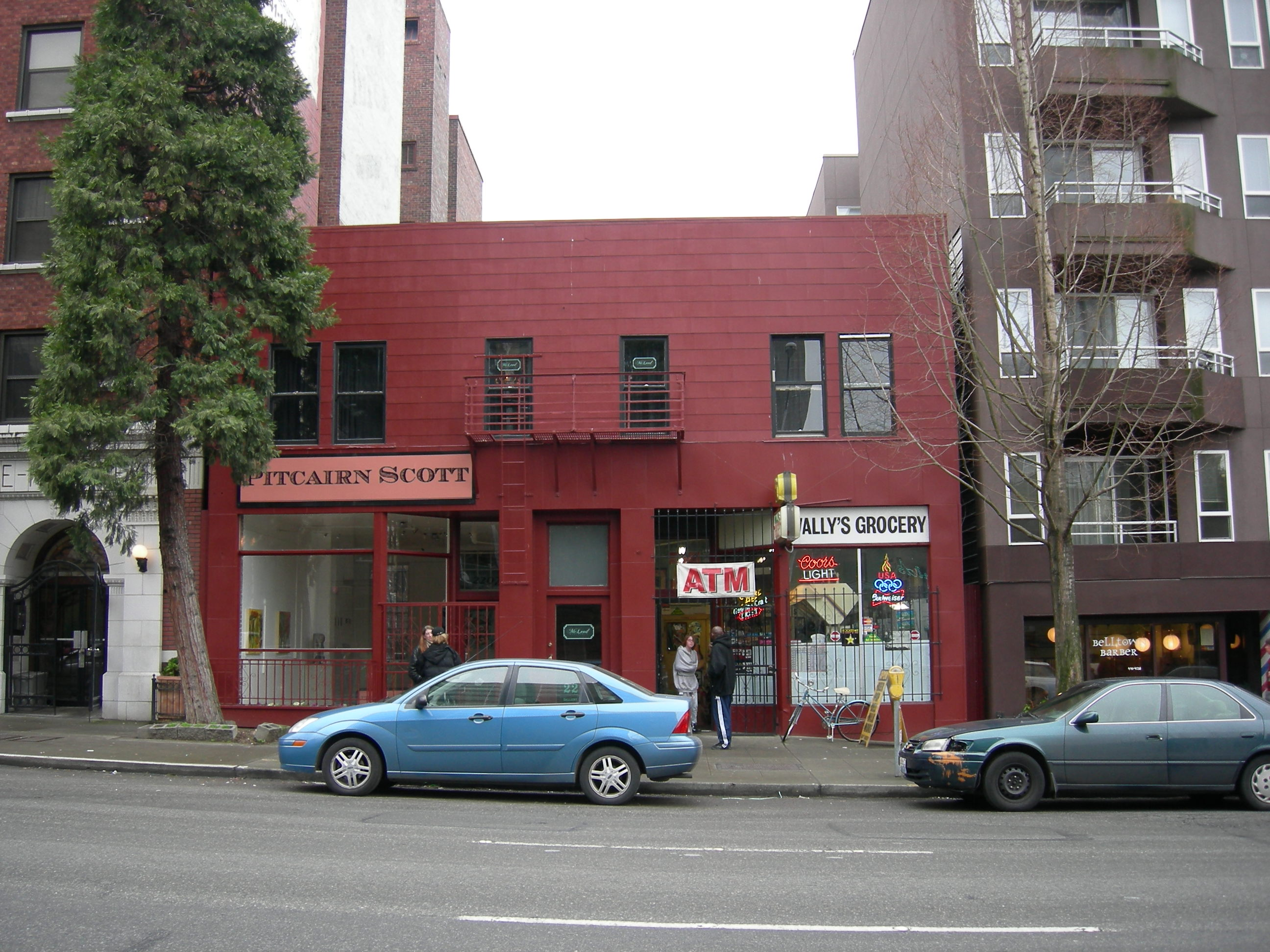
The McLeod Residence occupies the upper floor of this building.

The McLeod Residence was an art cooperative and gallery based in the Belltown area of Seattle, Washington. It closed in October 2008.

It was opened in December 2006 by Lele McLeod (born Leanne Ng) and Buster Butterfield McLeod (born Erik Benson of Seattle's Robot Co-op & 43 Things) as a blended gathering place for members interested in art, technology, and networking. Both cofounders legally changed their names as part of the launch.

The McLeod Residence occupied the second floor of a two-story mixed-use building in Belltown. The space was used for a six-room sale gallery, a bar open for members-only events, and a social club. Memberships cost $75 per year or $300 lifetime, or were granted in exchange for other mutually-agreed arrangements.

The gallery emphasized socialization and technology in unconventional ways. A touch-screen photo booth took visitors' pictures and immediately uploaded them to Flickr. Two "mirrors" by The Barbarian Group hung in the bathrooms, constantly taking photos and presenting them as photomosaics of previous photos.

Due to difficulties in complying with local fire codes, the McLeod Residence's owners announced that they would close their current gallery effective October 31, 2008. The owners said they would seek a new location. As of September 2010, the McLeod Residence has not been reopened in a new location.

A cocktail bar and gallery, The Upstairs, opened in the south half of the residence in December 2011.

== Notable events ==
On March 2, 2007, an installation called Seattle Notables focused on the many local celebrities of Seattle including Bill Gates, Paul Allen, "Juan the Frye Apartment Guy", and the Mariner Moose. Local artists produced photographs, paintings, and coasters featuring the various notables.

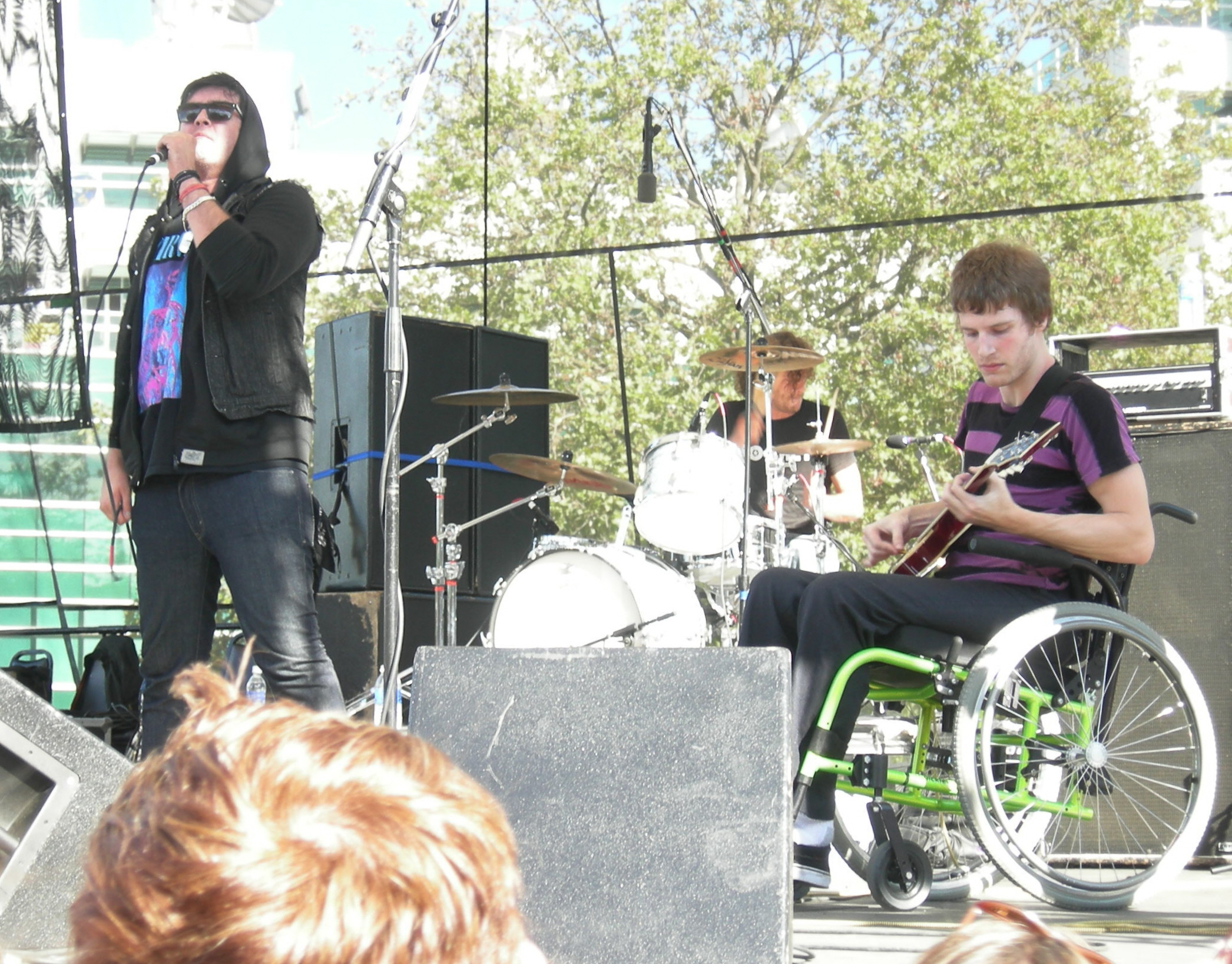
The Lashes, with Eric performing in a wheelchair, September 2007.

On May 17, 2007, the McLeod Residence hosted a benefit for Eric Howk, a member of Seattle band The Lashes, who was seriously injured in an accident. Donations collected at the event raised money to help cover Eric's medical bills.

In June 2007, The Barbarian Group installed two "McLeod Mirrors" in the McLeod Residence's restrooms. These mirrors, part of a limited edition of 100, are built using off-the-shelf computer hardware and represent onlookers as a photographic mosaic of previous onlookers. Members of the public may purchase a McLeod Mirror for $6,000. The mirrors were later integrated with additional interactive pieces in a July 2007 show entitled Interactivity.
