= It's Complicated Being a Wizard =

EP by Portugal. The Man
- Released: February 27, 2007
- Genres: Experimental rock, electronica
- Length: 22:58
- Label: Approaching AIRballoons

Portugal. The Man chronology
Devil Say I, I Say AIR (2006)	It's Complicated Being a Wizard (2007)	My Mind (2007)

Professional ratings
Review scores
Source	Rating
AbsolutePunk	8.3/10
Sonic Frontiers	8.2/10

It's Complicated Being a Wizard is Portugal. The Man's fifth release, released on February 27, 2007, through Public Music Records. Lead vocalist and chief songwriter, John Gourley, created the album artwork for this as well as all other Portugal. The Man releases.

In an interview with AbsolutePunk, Gourley gave fans an insight into the creation and concept of this mini-album: "It's Complicated Being a Wizard, I recorded that directly after Waiter was done. And it was just something that I started recording and just snowballed and became eventually 23 minutes, which is really funny because I actually set out to make it 23 minutes long after I got past 10 minutes."

The name of the album 'It's Complicated Being a Wizard' is in reference to former NBA player, Michael Jordan, whose number was famously 23 (the length in minutes of the title track). Jordan was a part owner of the Washington Wizards and was later a player on the team.

== Track listing ==
The EP consists of one track named It's Complicated Being a Wizard. The track is split up in 9 parts, listed here as separate tracks for easy browsing.

No.	Title	Length
1.	"Opal Magic"	0:50
2.	"Ruby Magic"	4:04
3.	"Sapphire Magic"	2:19
4.	"Amethyst Magic"	2:18
5.	"Emerald Magic"	2:31
6.	"Amber Magic"	3:25
7.	"Gold Magic"	2:27
8.	"Crystal Magic"	1:27
9.	"Black Magic"	3:37
Total length:		22:58
