= Waiter: "You Vultures!" =

Studio album by Portugal. The Man
- Released: January 24, 2006
- Recorded: Johnny Cab Studios, Shoreline, WA
- Genre: Math rock; emo; indie rock; experimental rock; progressive rock; post-hardcore
- Length: 52:40
- Label: Fearless
- Producer: Casey Bates, John Gourley

Portugal. The Man chronology
Under Waves of the Brown Coat (2005)	Waiter: "You Vultures!" (2006)	Church Mouth (2007)

Professional ratings
Review scores
Source	Rating
AbsolutePunk	8.5/10
AllMusic	2.5/5 stars
The A.V. Club	B

Waiter: "You Vultures!" is the debut studio album by American rock band Portugal. The Man. It is lead singer John Gourley and bassist Zach Carothers's first album released after leaving the band Anatomy of a Ghost. Unlike the band's later recorded material, the general style of their debut full-length veers closer to a progressive post-hardcore sound, with a marked influence of The Mars Volta in particular.

== Track listing ==
All tracks are written by John Baldwin Gourley.

No.	Title	Length
1.	"How the Leopard Got Its Spots"	3:59
2.	"Gold Fronts"	3:27
3.	"Stables & Chairs"	3:16
4.	"AKA M80 the Wolf"	3:56
5.	"Marching With 6"	3:02
6.	"Elephants"	4:03
7.	"Waiter"	3:23
8.	"Chicago"	4:13
9.	"Bad, Bad Levi Brown"	3:29
10.	"Kill Me. The King"	3:05
11.	"Tommy"	4:27
12.	"Horse Warming Party"	3:44
13.	"Guns. Guns...Guns"	8:30

== Personnel ==
Portugal. The Man

- John Baldwin Gourley – vocals, guitar
- Wesley James Hubbard – vocals, keyboard
- Zachary Scott Carothers – bass, vocals
- Jason Sechrist – drums

Additional personnel

- Justin Baiers – additional percussion (track 3)
- Nic Newsham – additional vocals (tracks 5 and 6)
- Thunderball Fist – additional vocals and keyboards (track 13)
- Casey Bates – engineering
- A. William Bentley – additional vocals and guitars (track 7)
- Austin Sousa – additional engineering
- Ed Brooks – mastering
- John Gourley – illustration
- Wesley Hubbard – illustration
- Austin Sellers – design, photography, illustration
