= Live in the Moment (song) =

Single by Portugal. The Man

from the album Woodstock
- Released: October 30, 2017
- Genre: Pop rock; pop; electropop
- Length: 4:06 (album version); 3:24 (radio edit)
- Label: Atlantic
- Songwriters: John Gourley; John Hill; Ammar Malik
- Producers: John Hill; Rallier

Portugal. The Man singles chronology
"Feel It Still" (2017)	"Live in the Moment" (2017)	"Tidal Wave" (2018)

"Live in the Moment" is a song by American rock band Portugal. The Man. It was released as a single from their eighth studio album Woodstock in 2017. The song peaked at number one on the Billboard Adult Alternative Songs chart in January 2018 and the Billboard Alternative Songs chart in March 2018. In 2017, "Live in the Moment" was featured in the soundtrack for FIFA 18. The following year, the band performed a live rendition of the song on The Late Show with Stephen Colbert in February 2018.

== Background ==
In an interview with Songwriter Universe magazine, lead singer John Gourley said the inspiration behind "Live in the Moment" came to him after a recording session when he wanted to provide a modern approach to the phrase. Gourley provided the music to the song while co-writing alongside songwriters Ammar Malik and John Hill.

== Recording ==
For the song's ending, the band used text-to-speech software to have a computer read out the lyrics. Bassist Zach Carothers said "Live in the Moment" was recorded over twenty times before the final released track.

== Music video ==
On November 1, 2017, a music video for "Live in the Moment" was released. The agency Wieden+Kennedy was behind the video which featured a police chase of a giant puppet skateboarding on top of a car. The video was filmed in Portland, Oregon.

== Chart performance ==
In January 2018, "Live in the Moment" peaked at number one on the Billboard Adult Alternative Songs chart. A few months later, the song reached number one on the Billboard Alternative Songs chart in March 2018.

=== Weekly charts ===
Chart (2017-2018)	Peak position
Belgium (Ultratip Bubbling Under Wallonia)	25
Canada Rock (Billboard)	3
Iceland (Tónlistinn)	11
Italy Airplay (EarOne)	2
Netherlands Single Tip (MegaCharts)	23
Poland Airplay (ZPAV)	33
Switzerland Airplay (Schweizer Hitparade)	12
US Hot Rock & Alternative Songs (Billboard)	10
US Rock & Alternative Airplay (Billboard)	2

=== Year-end charts ===
Chart (2018)	Position
Iceland (Plötutíóindi)	71
US Hot Rock Songs (Billboard)	19
US Rock Airplay (Billboard)	4

== Certifications ==
Region	Certification	Certified units/sales
Canada (Music Canada)	Gold	40,000^{‡}
Italy (FIMI)	Gold	25,000^{‡}
United States (RIAA)	Gold	500,000^{‡}
^{‡} Sales+streaming figures based on certification alone.
