= Ben Lashes =

American talent manager

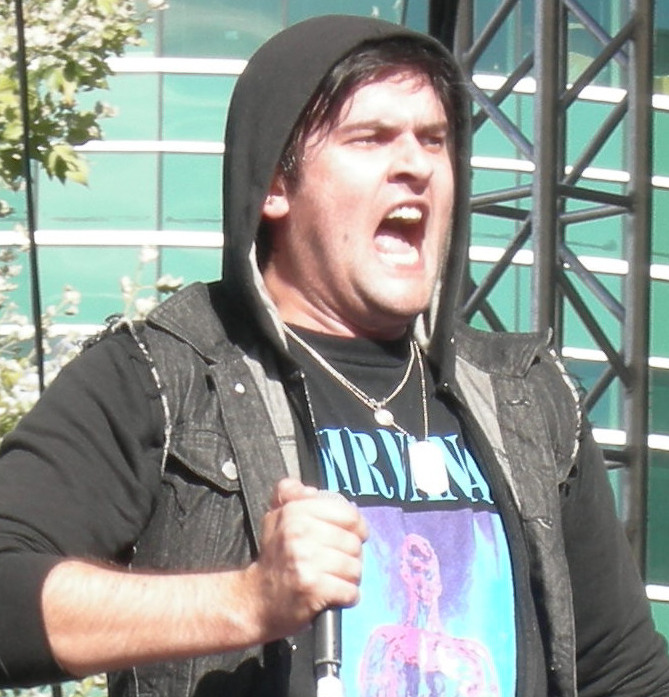
- Ben Clark performing with the Lashes at Bumbershoot 2007
- Born: Ben Clark
- Occupation: Talent manager

Ben Clark, better known as Ben Lashes, is an American talent manager known for representing various Internet memes. He was previously the lead singer for the Lashes.

== Music career ==
Ben Clark founded the Lashes, a Seattle-based power pop band, in 2000. The band released The Stupid Stupid EP through Lookout Records in 2004 before signing with Columbia Records in 2005. Their first album, Get It, was released in 2006. Kim Warnick began to call him Ben Lashes to distinguish him from a drummer named Ben in her own band, and the name caught on. The Lashes described themselves as "Seattle's most-hated band". The band's guitarist, Eric Howk, became paralyzed from the waist down in 2007, and the band has been inactive since 2008. Ben Lashes began working in the artists and repertoire department of an independent music distributor.

== Managerial career ==
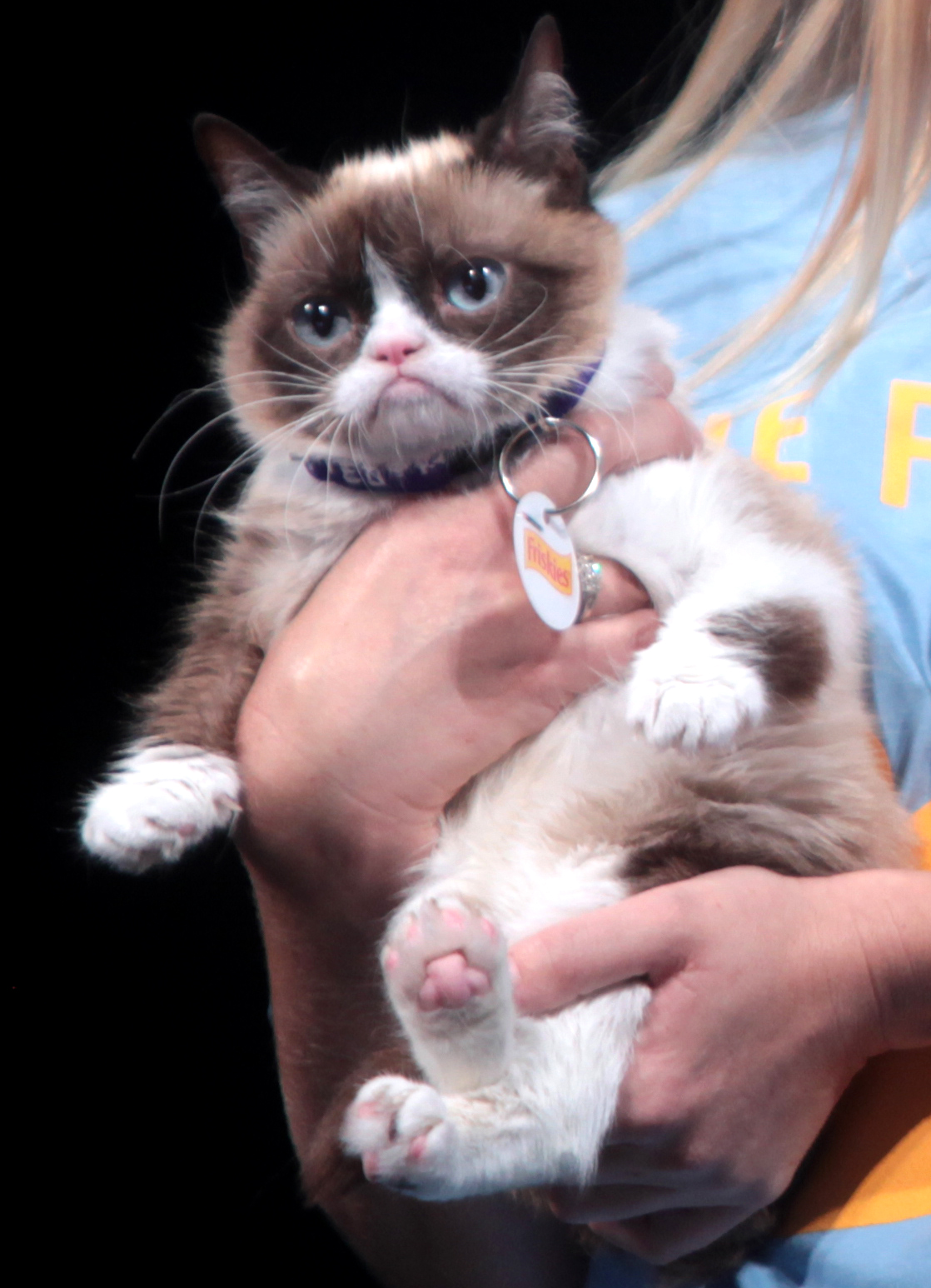
Ben Lashes is known for representing Tardar Sauce a.k.a. Grumpy Cat.

In 2009, Lashes was contacted by a friend of his, Charlie Schmidt, the creator of the viral Keyboard Cat video. Schmidt wanted advice on how to capitalize on the video, and Lashes had experience in the music distribution industry, so Lashes became a talent manager for Keyboard Cat. After Keyboard Cat, he began to represent other memes. Other memes he represents the licenses for include Grumpy Cat, Nyan Cat, Disaster Girl, Doge, Harambe, Dancing baby, Dancing Pallbearers, Leeroy Jenkins, the dress, and Scumbag Steve. Lashes has described himself as "the first meme manager".

Lashes licensed the Keyboard Cat video to be used in advertising by The Wonderful Company and Nokia, and other memes he licenses have also appeared in advertisements. Lashes was particularly successful with the licensing of Grumpy Cat. Grumpy Cat appeared in television interviews, a Christmas film, a book, and had commercial deals with the Friskies cat food brand and the Grenade iced coffee brand. Lashes received a 20% cut of Grumpy Cat's licensing and merchandise revenue. Lashes described Grumpy Cat as a "seven-figure cat", saying that her branding had generated around $100 million.

In 2013, Lashes helped Charlie Schmidt and Christopher Torres file a successful lawsuit against Warner Bros. for the unlicensed use of Keyboard Cat and Nyan Cat in the video game Scribblenauts Unlimited.
