= Shish (album) =

Studio album by Portugal. The Man
- Released: November 7, 2025
- Length: 41:46
- Labels: KNIK Records; Thirty Tigers
- Producers: Kane Richotte; John Gourley

Portugal. The Man chronology
Chris Black Changed My Life (2023)	Shish (2025)

Singles from Shish
- 1. "Denali" Released: September 4, 2025; 2. "Tanana/Mush" Released: September 24, 2025

Shish is the tenth studio album by the American rock band Portugal. The Man. It was released on November 7, 2025, by Thirty Tigers and KNIK Records.

== Composition and lyrics ==
Portugal. The Man lead singer John Gourley commented that "Shish" is "survival, connection, and ambition. Rural life with moments of danger and absurdity, like dirt bikes, smokers, gunfire, and video games. The repeated line ‘we can be family’ pushes against isolation, reaching for something solid". Gourley also commented on "Tanana", simply stating it "voices a generational sadness, searching for fleeting meaning in a world on edge."

== Release and promotion ==
Shish was released on November 7, 2025 on Thirty Tigers. The album was preceded by two singles; "Denali" and "Tanana/Mush". The album is being followed by a tour dubbed as the Denali Tour, that began on the date of the album's release.

== Reception ==
Professional ratings
Review scores
Source	Rating
AllMusic	4.5/5 stars

Writing for AllMusic, critic Matt Collar wrote it "feels as personal as anything Gourley has done, a kaleidoscopic sonic homage to Alaska", concluding John Gourley "has made an album that evokes the Teutonic permafrost wilderness, dreamscapes, and lonely small town punk-kid spirit that gave birth to Portugal. The Man."

== Track listing ==
Standard edition
No.	Title	Length
1.	"Denali"	4:15
2.	"Pittman Ralliers"	2:46
3.	"Angoon"	4:37
4.	"Knik"	5:38
5.	"Shish"	5:26
6.	"Mush"	2:43
7.	"Tyonek"	4:30
8.	"Kokhanockers"	3:09
9.	"Tanana"	3:19
10.	"Father Gun"	5:23
Total length:		41:46

== Personnel ==
Credits adapted from Bandcamp.

=== Portugal. The Man ===
- John Gourley – vocals, guitar, Fender 6, synthesizers, acoustic guitar, programming, piano, production
- Zoe Manville – vocals, rapping
- Kyle O'Quin – string arrangement, cello

=== Additional contributors ===
- Kane Ritchotte – production, engineering, drums, Wurlitzer, bass, guitar, programming, Mellotron, organ, synthesizers, acoustic guitar, Moog, percussion, Enner
- John Congleton – mixing
- Nick Reinhart – guitar, bass
- Randy Merrill – mastering
- Kyle Smith – engineering
- Edgar McRae – engineering
- Zach Bloomstein – engineering
- Dani Bell – vocals, whistles, Omnichord
- Sam Gellerstein – trombone
- David Marion – vocals
- Malcolm McRae – vocals
- Dylan Rieck – cello
- Asa Taccone – vocals
- Jared Tankel – saxophone, baritone saxophone
- Ryan Wiggins – trumpet
