= Chris Black Changed My Life =

Studio album by Portugal. The Man
- Released: June 23, 2023
- Length: 34:20
- Label: Atlantic
- Producer: Jeff Bhasker; Tommy Danvers; Asa Taccone

Portugal. The Man chronology
Oregon City Sessions (2021)	Chris Black Changed My Life (2023)	Shish (2025)

Singles from Chris Black Changed My Life
- 1. "Dummy" Released: March 1, 2023; 2. "Champ" Released: April 16, 2023; 3. "Thunderdome [W.T.A.]" Released: May 12, 2023; 4. "Summer of Luv" Released: May 24, 2023; 5. "Plastic Island" Released: June 8, 2023

Chris Black Changed My Life is the ninth studio album by American rock band Portugal. The Man. It was released on June 23, 2023, by Atlantic Records. The album was primarily produced by Jeff Bhasker and Asa Taccone, with Tommy Danvers, Tyler Johnson, and Casey Bates also contributing to production.

== Background ==
The album is dedicated to the band's longtime friend and the album's namesake Chris Black, who died in May 2019.

== Promotion ==
The album was supported by the release of the lead single "Dummy" on March 1, 2023, when the album was first announced. Simultaneously, the song was licensed for use in a Taco Bell advertisement campaign the same month. The second single, "Champ", was released on April 16, 2023. The third single, "Thunderdome [W.T.A.]", was released on May 12, 2023. The fourth single, "Summer of Luv", was released on May 24, 2023. The fifth and final single, "Plastic Island", was released on June 8, 2023.

== Track listing ==
Chris Black Changed My Life track listing
No.	Title	Writer(s)	Producer(s)	Length
1.	"Heavy Games II" (featuring Jeff Bhasker)	John Gourley; Jeff Bhasker	Bhasker	1:03
2.	"Grim Generation"	Gourley; Zach Carothers; Eric Howk; Zoe Manville; Kyle O'Quin; Bhasker; Homer Steinweiss; Asa Taccone	Bhasker; Taccone^{[a]}	3:20
3.	"Thunderdome [W.T.A.]" (featuring Black Thought and Natalia Lafourcade)	Gourley; Carothers; O'Quin; Sarah Aarons; Bhasker; Manuel Calderon; Adria Del Valle; Tyler Johnson; Ruban Nielson; Paulina Reza; Steinweiss	Bhasker; Johnson^{[a]}	2:54
4.	"Dummy"	Gourley; Manville; O'Quin; Jason Sechrist; Casey Bates; Taccone	Taccone	2:25
5.	"Summer of Luv" (featuring Unknown Mortal Orchestra)	Gourley; Carothers; O'Quin; Bhasker; Nick Reinhart; Taccone	Bhasker; Taccone	2:39
6.	"Ghost Town"	Gourley; O'Quin; James Fauntleroy; Steinweiss; Taccone	Bhasker; Taccone	3:19
7.	"Time's a Fantasy" (featuring Jeff Bhasker)	Gourley; O'Quin; Bhasker; The Last Artful, Dodgr; Matthew Leon	Bhasker	3:02
8.	"Doubt"	Gourley; O'Quin; Bhasker; Kane Ritchotte; Taccone	Bhasker	3:02
9.	"Plastic Island"	Gourley; O'Quin; Bhasker; Steinweiss; Taccone	Bhasker; Taccone^{[a]}	3:03
10.	"Champ" (featuring Edgar Winter)	Gourley; Manville; O'Quin; Sechrist; Bates; Tobias Jesso Jr.; Steinweiss; Edgar Winter	Bhasker; Tommy Danvers; Bates^{[a]}	3:49
11.	"Anxiety:Clarity" (featuring Paul Williams)	Gourley; O'Quin; Bhasker; Steinweiss; Taccone; Paul Williams	Bhasker	5:44
Total length:				34:20

Note

- ^{^[a]} signifies an additional producer.

== Personnel ==
Portugal. The Man

- Zach Carothers – vocals (track 6)
- John Gourley – vocals (all tracks), guitar (2–6, 8–11), bass guitar (2, 4, 9)
- Eric Howk – guitar (2)
- Zoe Manville – vocals
- Kyle O'Quin – bass guitar (1, 11), piano (2, 4–6, 8–10), arrangement (2, 8), guitar (3, 4, 9, 11), drums (4), brass arrangement (10)
- Jason Sechrist – percussion (2), vocals (4)

Additional musicians

- Jeff Bhasker – piano (1, 7, 11), vocals (1, 3, 7, 10, 11), bass guitar (2), synthesizer (3, 7, 10, 11), Hammond organ (5, 9, 10)
- The Last Artful, Dodgr – vocals (1, 3, 7, 11)
- Homer Steinweiss – drums (2, 3, 5, 6, 9, 11)
- Anthony Saffrey – synthesizer (2, 3, 5, 6), guitar (6)
- Steve Smith – percussion (2, 3, 6, 10)
- Asa Taccone – vocals (2–4, 8, 9, 11), programming (4, 9), synthesizer (4), whistle (6)
- Nick Reinhart – guitar (2, 5)
- Ben Stiller – percussion (2, 6, 10)
- Edie Lehmann Boddicker – choir vocals (2, 7, 11), choir conductor (2)
- Ayo Awosika – choir vocals (2, 7, 11)
- Baraka May – choir vocals (2, 7, 11)
- Charlean Carmon – choir vocals (2, 7, 11)
- Danielle Withers – choir vocals (2, 7, 11)
- Darryl Phinnessee – choir vocals (2, 7, 11)
- David Loucks – choir vocals (2, 7, 11)
- Dorian Holley – choir vocals (2, 7, 11)
- Gaayatri Kaundinya – choir vocals (2, 7, 11)
- Holly Sedillos – choir vocals (2, 7, 11)
- India Carney – choir vocals (2, 7, 11)
- Jarrett Johnson – choir vocals (2, 7, 11)
- Jason Morales – choir vocals (2, 7, 11)
- Jim Gilstrap – choir vocals (2, 7, 11)
- Kenton Chen – choir vocals (2, 7, 11)
- Luke Edgemon – choir vocals (2, 7, 11)
- Matt Bloyd – choir vocals (2, 7, 11)
- May Sykes – choir vocals (2, 7, 11)
- Monique Donnelly – choir vocals (2, 7, 11)
- Nayanna Holley – choir vocals (2, 7, 11)
- Nelson Beato – choir vocals (2, 7, 11)
- Oren Waters – choir vocals (2, 7, 11)
- Stevie Mackey – choir vocals (2, 7, 11)
- Tehillah Alphonso – choir vocals (2, 7, 11)
- Toni Scruggs – choir vocals (2, 7, 11)
- Jonathan Drummond – bass guitar (2, 11)
- Rosie Danvers – brass arrangement, conductor (2, 10); arrangement, cello (8)
- Andy Wood – trombone (2, 10)
- Daniel Higham – trombone (2, 10)
- James Davison – trumpet (2, 10)
- Louis Dowdeswell – trumpet (2, 10)
- Louis Walsh – trumpet (2, 10)
- Tommy Danvers – brass arrangement (2)
- Adria Del Valle – vocals (3, 6)
- Paulina Reza – vocals (3, 6)
- Alaap Sikander – guitar (3)
- Josue Rivas – percussion, vocals (3)
- Black Thought – vocals (3)
- Natalia Lafourcade – vocals (3)
- Cynthia Perinat – vocals (4)
- Michael Harris – vocals (4)
- Olivia Shapiro – vocals (4)
- Shana Levy – vocals (4)
- Ian Roller – alto saxophone, piccolo (5); saxophone (11)
- Ruban Nielson – vocals (5)
- Frances Gourley – vocals (6, 7)
- James Fauntleroy – vocals (6)
- Sean Leon – vocals (7)
- Jane Oliver – cello (8)
- Richard Pryce – double bass (8)
- Kane Ritchotte – drums (8)
- Meghan Cassidy – viola (8)
- Nick Barr – viola (8)
- Eleanor Mathieson – violin (8)
- Ellie Stanford – violin (8)
- Hayley Pomfret – violin (8)
- Jenny Sacha – violin (8)
- Patrick Kiernan – violin (8)
- Sally Jackson – violin (8)
- Sarah Sexton – violin (8)
- Takunda Masando – programming (9)
- Edgar Winter – saxophone, synthesizer, vocals (10)
- With War – vocals (10)
- Hether – guitar (11)
- Howard Wiley – saxophone (11)
- Jacob Scesney – saxophone (11)
- Paul Williams – vocals (11)

Technical

- Randy Merrill – mastering
- Mark "Spike" Stent – mixing (1–3, 6–11)
- Lars Stalfors – mixing (4, 5)
- Ryan Nasci – engineering (1–3, 5–11)
- Alex Thompson – engineering (1–4, 11)
- Jens Jungkurth – engineering (2, 5, 6, 9–11)
- Kennie Takahashi – engineering (3)
- Matthew Neighbour – mixing assistance (4, 5)

== Charts ==
Chart performance for Chris Black Changed My Life
Chart (2023)	Peak position
French Physical Albums (SNEP)	180
Swiss Albums (Schweizer Hitparade)	92
