= The Satanic Satanist =

2009 studio album by Portugal. The Man

Studio album by Portugal. The Man
- Released: July 21, 2009
- Genre: Psychedelic pop
- Length: 34:44
- Label: Equal Vision
- Producer: Paul Q. Kolderie, Anthony Saffery, Adam Taylor

Portugal. The Man chronology
Censored Colors (2008)	The Satanic Satanist (2009)	The Majestic Majesty (2009)

Singles from The Satanic Satanist
- 1. "People Say" Released: June 1, 2009

Professional ratings
Aggregate scores
Source	Rating
Metacritic	(79/100)
Review scores
Source	Rating
AllMusic	3.5/5 stars
Antiquiet	5/5 stars
Billboard	4/5 stars
Entertainment Weekly	A−
Pitchfork	6.5/10
Sputnikmusic	4/5 stars
The Tune	4.6/5

The Satanic Satanist is the fourth studio album by American rock band Portugal. The Man. The album's artwork is a combination of photographs and watercolor illustrations by lead singer John Gourley.

On June 1, 2009, the band released the song "People Say" for free download on their official website.

On June 24, 2009, the album leaked on the Internet. Lead singer John Gourley posted a blog entry regarding the leak on the band's official website. The statement encouraged fans to download the album, but to also support the band and purchase the record upon release if enjoyed.

On October 1, 2010, the band released onto YouTube a music video for the song "People Say", directed by Michael Ragen and produced by Joy Saez.

This album featured a guest drummer who had been touring with them while Jason Sechrist took a leave of absence from the band.

== Track listing ==
All tracks are written by John Baldwin Gourley.

No.	Title	Length
1.	"People Say"	2:59
2.	"Work All Day"	2:59
3.	"Lovers in Love"	3:14
4.	"The Sun"	3:01
5.	"The Home"	2:57
6.	"The Woods"	3:12
7.	"Guns & Dogs"	2:45
8.	"Do You"	2:55
9.	"Everyone Is Golden"	3:46
10.	"Let You Down"	2:17
11.	"Mornings"	4:39

== Personnel ==
Portugal. The Man

- John Baldwin Gourley – vocals, guitar, organ, machines
- Garrett Lunceford – drums and gang
- Ryan Neighbors – piano, rhodes, organ, synth, vocals
- Zachary Scott Carothers – bass guitar, percussion, vocals

Additional personnel

- Zoe Manville – vocals

== Charts ==
Chart (2009)	Peak position
German Albums (Offizielle Top 100)	68
US Billboard 200	81
US Top Rock Albums (Billboard)	38
