= Evil Friends =

Studio album by Portugal. The Man
- Released: June 4, 2013
- Genres: Psychedelic pop; psychedelic rock; progressive rock
- Length: 48:35
- Label: Atlantic
- Producer: Danger Mouse

Portugal. The Man chronology
In the Mountain in the Cloud (2011)	Evil Friends (2013)	Woodstock (2017)

Singles from Evil Friends
- 1. "Evil Friends" Released: April 1, 2013; 2. "Purple Yellow Red and Blue" Released: April 23, 2013; 3. "Modern Jesus" Released: August 30, 2013

Evil Friends is the seventh studio album by American rock band Portugal. The Man. It was released on June 4, 2013 through Atlantic Records. It is the band's first collaboration with producer Danger Mouse.

The album was promoted by the singles "Evil Friends", "Purple Yellow Red and Blue" and "Modern Jesus". It received favorable reviews from music critics, and charted in the US, Austria, Germany, France and Switzerland.

== Promotion ==
Throughout early 2013, Portugal. The Man teased Evil Friends by leaking pictures on the official Bonnaroo Tumblr page, which showed that celebrated producer Danger Mouse (best known for his work with MF Doom, Gnarls Barkley, Jack White and Broken Bells, and for producing award-winning albums for artists like Gorillaz, The Black Keys and Norah Jones), was producing Portugal. The Man's new record.

On February 25, 2013, the band revealed the title of the album on Instagram. On March 6, the band revealed the album art for Evil Friends using a Tweet-To-Reveal Mosaic.

In the months leading up to the release of the album, John Gourley posted dozens of photos on the band's Instagram and Tumblr feeds featuring portraits of high-profile celebrities and musicians, including Thom Yorke and Kendrick Lamar, overlaid with his satanic illustrations. The band partnered with Aviary web application suite to release a sticker pack of the various elements in these drawings, allowing fans to create their own #EvilFriends portraits and upload them to Instagram.

On May 29, 2013 the band held a party in partnership with Tumblr at LAB ART Los Angeles that showcased the artwork of The Fantastic The (John Gourley and Austin Sellers) and the photography of Danger Mouse, and featured a GIF-ITI mural collaboration between John Gourley and street artist INSA. Evil Friends was simultaneously released as streaming online on the band's Tumblr page.

== Singles and music videos ==
On March 7, 2013, the band released a music video for the album's lead single and title track "Evil Friends". The video was directed by Michael Ragen. The song was released to modern rock radio stations on April 1, 2013.

"Purple Yellow Red and Blue" was released as the second single to promote the album on April 23, 2013. A music video for the song, directed by That Go (Noel Paul and Stefan Moore), was released onto YouTube a day earlier. The song was released to radio on May 20, 2013, and was later featured in the soundtrack of EA Sports game, FIFA 14. The track features background vocals by Este and Danielle Haim of the American alternative rock band Haim.

On May 23, 2013, the band released a music video for "Atomic Man", directed by David Vincent Wolf.

The third and final single from the album, "Modern Jesus", was released digitally on August 30, 2013. On August 7, a music video directed by AG Rojas was released. The song impacted modern rock radio stations on October 28, 2013.

== Critical reception ==
Professional ratings
Aggregate scores
Source	Rating
AnyDecentMusic?	6.7/10
Metacritic	76/100
Review scores
Source	Rating
AllMusic	3.5/5 stars
Alternative Press	4/5 stars
The Austin Chronicle	4/5 stars
The A.V. Club	B
Consequence of Sound	3.5/5 stars
Paste	8.8/10
Pitchfork	6.0/10
PopMatters	8/10
Rolling Stone	3/5 stars
Spin	7/10

Evil Friends received generally favorable reviews from music critics. At Metacritic, which assigns a normalized rating out of 100 to reviews from mainstream critics, the album received an average score of 76, based on 17 reviews.

== Track listing ==
All tracks are written by John Baldwin Gourley and Danger Mouse.

No.	Title	Length
1.	"Plastic Soldiers"	5:04
2.	"Creep in a T-Shirt"	3:54
3.	"Evil Friends"	3:36
4.	"Modern Jesus"	3:14
5.	"Hip Hop Kids"	3:28
6.	"Atomic Man"	3:48
7.	"Sea of Air"	4:22
8.	"Waves"	4:52
9.	"Holy Roller (Hallelujah)"	3:21
10.	"Someday Believers"	3:54
11.	"Purple Yellow Red and Blue"	4:11
12.	"Smile"	4:51

== Personnel ==
Portugal. The Man

- John Baldwin Gourley – vocals, guitar, organ, synthesizers
- Zachary Scott Carothers – bass, percussion, backing vocals
- Kyle O'Quin – piano, synthesizers, whistle
- Noah Gersh – guitar, percussion, backing vocals
- Kane Ritchotte – percussion, backing vocals

Technical personnel

- Danger Mouse – production, synthesizer
- Phillip Peterson – strings, arranging
- Patton Thomas – production, noise, soundscapes, spoken word

== Charts ==
Chart (2013–2023)	Peak position
Australian Albums (ARIA)	100
Austrian Albums (Ö3 Austria)	64
French Albums (SNEP)	93
German Albums (Offizielle Top 100)	89
Hungarian Physical Albums (MAHASZ)	32
Swiss Albums (Schweizer Hitparade)	74
US Billboard 200	28
US Top Alternative Albums (Billboard)	9
US Top Rock Albums (Billboard)	12
