= Anatomy of a Ghost =

American emo band

- Origin: Portland, Oregon, United States
- Genres: Emo; emocore; screamo; post-hardcore
- Years active: 2002–2004
- Labels: Fearless
- Past members: John Gourley; Nick Simon; Zachary Carothers; Joe Simon; Dewey Halpaus

Anatomy of a Ghost was an American emo band from Portland, Oregon, some of whose members originally hailed from Alaska.

== History ==
Anatomy of a Ghost formed early in 2002 and gained popularity through live performances and through internet promotional channels. In 2003, they toured the United States with Saosin and Boys Night Out. Their debut (and only) record, Evanesce, was released in October 2003 on Fearless Records. Despite a warm critical reception, the group broke up in May 2004. The group reunited briefly in 2005 to put together a new album, but the project never materialized. In the meantime, John Gourley and Zach Carothers began playing in the group Portugal. The Man, and Dewey Halpaus had started a group called The Burning Room. Prior to forming Anatomy of a Ghost, Dewey Halpaus, and brothers Nick and Joe Simon were in a band called Nice Guy Eddie.

== Band members ==
- John Gourley – vocals
- Nick Simon – drums
- Zachary Carothers – bass
- Joe Simon – guitar
- Dewey Halpaus – guitar

== Discography ==
Studio albums

- Evanesce (Fearless Records, 2003)
