= Feel It Still =

2017 single by Portugal. The Man

Single by Portugal. The Man

from the album Woodstock
- B-side: "Is It Coming"
- Released: March 3, 2017
- Genre: Psychedelic pop; funk; alternative rock; soul
- Length: 2:43
- Label: Atlantic
- Songwriters: Robert Bateman; Zachary Scott Carothers; Freddie Gorman; John Baldwin Gourley; John Hill; Brian Holland; Eric Andrew Howk; Kyle O'Quin; Jason Wade Sechrist; Asa Taccone
- Producers: John Hill; Asa Taccone

Portugal. The Man singles chronology
"Noise Pollution" (2016)	"Feel It Still" (2017)	"Live in the Moment" (2017)

Music video
- "Feel It Still" on YouTube

"Feel It Still" is a song by American rock band Portugal. The Man. The song draws on the melody from the Marvelettes' 1961 hit "Please Mr. Postman"; written by the band along with producers John Hill and Asa Taccone, "Feel It Still" also includes a credit for Motown songwriter Brian Holland. It serves as the second single and first radio single off their eighth studio album, Woodstock. The song reached number one on the US Alternative Songs, Mexican and Russian Tophit airplay chart. It was also their first entry on the US Billboard Hot 100, becoming a sleeper hit, as it took eight months to peak at number four in November 2017.

The track reached the top 10 in 18 countries including Australia, Belgium, Canada, France, Germany, Ireland, New Zealand, Norway, Portugal, Slovenia, Spain, Switzerland, the United Kingdom and the United States.

In January 2018, the song won the Best Pop Duo/Group Performance at the 60th Annual Grammy Awards.

== Composition ==
Sheet music for the song "Feel It Still" is published in C♯ minor in common time signature with a suggested tempo of "quick with zest" at 158 beats per minute.

== Music video ==
The music video was released on March 6, 2017. An interactive version was also released, powered by technology from WIREWAX. The interactive video contained "Easter eggs" that a viewer could click on to build their #resist toolkit to learn and support 30 different social and political causes.

== Commercial performance ==
The song became the band's first to top both the Billboard Alternative Songs and the Adult Alternative Songs charts. Taking six weeks to do so, it is the fastest an artist has achieved their first chart-topper on the latter chart since Mumford & Sons' "I Will Wait" took three weeks to reach number one. "Feel It Still" also climbed to number four on the Billboard Hot 100, becoming their first entry on the chart. The song also peaked at number one on the Russian and Mexican airplay charts and in the top 20 in France and Switzerland. "Feel It Still" spent 20 weeks at number one on the Alternative Songs chart, becoming the longest-running number-one song on that chart, beating out "Madness" by Muse, which spent 19 weeks at the top from 2012 to 2013. In February 2021, for the 25th anniversary of Adult Alternative Songs, Billboard ranked "Feel It Still" at number 4 on its list of the 100 most successful songs in the chart's history; in September 2023, the magazine ranked the song at number 5 on a similar retrospective list for the 35th anniversary of Alternative Songs.

In Billboard's November 11, 2017 issue, "Feel It Still" joined the list of songs since 2003 to have reached number one on six of the major airplay charts: Radio Songs, Pop Songs, Adult Pop Songs, Alternative Songs, Adult Alternative Songs and Dance/Mix Show Airplay. Portugal. The Man is the first act to accomplish this feat since Gotye and Kimbra with "Somebody That I Used to Know" in 2012; they are the only artists to have a number-one Alternative and Adult Alternative single also reach number one on the Dance/Mix Show Airplay since the chart's launch in August 2003. They are now also one of twelve acts to have achieved the feat of having reached number one on six or more airplay charts. The YouTube video has more than 362,000,000 views.

== Charts ==
=== Weekly charts ===
Chart (2017–2018)	Peak position
Argentina Anglo Airplay (Monitor Latino)	2
Australia (ARIA)	5
Austria (Ö3 Austria Top 40)	4
Belarus Airplay (Eurofest)	1
Belgium (Ultratop 50 Flanders)	2
Belgium (Ultratop 50 Wallonia)	4
Bolivia Airplay (Monitor Latino)	3
Bulgaria Airplay (PROPHON)	1
Canada Hot 100 (Billboard)	8
Canada Rock (Billboard)	11
Colombia Airplay (National-Report)	44
CIS Airplay (TopHit)	2
Czech Republic Airplay (ČNS IFPI)	35
Czech Republic Singles Digital (ČNS IFPI)	6
France (SNEP)	3
Germany (GfK)	7
Greece International (IFPI)	3
Honduras Airplay (Monitor Latino)	13
Hungary (Dance Top 40)	22
Hungary (Rádiós Top 40)	5
Hungary (Single Top 40)	4
Hungary (Stream Top 40)	13
Iceland (Tonlist)	1
Ireland (IRMA)	10
Italy (FIMI)	83
Japan Hot Overseas (Billboard)	17
Latvia Streaming (LaIPA)	17
Mexico Airplay (Billboard)	2
Netherlands (Dutch Top 40)	10
Netherlands (Single Top 100)	28
New Zealand (Recorded Music NZ)	7
Norway (VG-lista)	9
Philippines (Philippine Hot 100)	65
Poland Airplay (ZPAV)	10
Portugal (AFP)	8
Russia Airplay (TopHit)	1
Scottish Singles Sales (Official Charts)	3
Serbia Airplay (Radiomonitor)	1
Slovakia Airplay (ČNS IFPI)	1
Slovakia Singles Digital (ČNS IFPI)	9
Slovenia Airplay (SloTop50)	2
Spain (Promusicae)	42
Sweden (Sverigetopplistan)	17
Switzerland (Schweizer Hitparade)	7
UK Singles (Official Charts)	3
Uruguay Airplay (Monitor Latino)	15
US Billboard Hot 100	4
US Adult Contemporary (Billboard)	2
US Adult Pop Airplay (Billboard)	1
US Dance Club Songs (Billboard)	28
US Hot Rock & Alternative Songs (Billboard)	1
US Pop Airplay (Billboard)	1
US Rhythmic Airplay (Billboard)	30
US Rock & Alternative Airplay (Billboard)	1
Venezuela Airplay (National-Report)	43

2024 weekly chart performance for "Feel It Still"
Chart (2024)	Peak position
Kazakhstan Airplay (TopHit)	61

=== Year-end charts ===
Chart (2017)	Position
Australia (ARIA)	55
Austria (Ö3 Austria Top 40)	50
Belgium (Ultratop Flanders)	70
Canada (Canadian Hot 100)	60
France (SNEP)	105
Germany (Official German Charts)	76
Hungary (Single Top 40)	68
Hungary (Stream Top 40)	72
Iceland (Tónlistinn)	10
Israel International Airplay (Media Forest)	29
Latvia Airplay (LaIPA)	36
Netherlands (Dutch Top 40)	71
Poland (ZPAV)	77
Russia (Tophit)	6
Spain Airplay (PROMUSICAE)	35
Switzerland (Schweizer Hitparade)	53
US Billboard Hot 100	45
US Adult Top 40 (Billboard)	18
US Hot Rock Songs (Billboard)	3
US Mainstream Top 40 (Billboard)	30
US Rock Airplay (Billboard)	2

Chart (2018)	Position
Argentina (Monitor Latino)	27
Australia (ARIA)	35
Belgium (Ultratop Flanders)	14
Belgium (Ultratop Wallonia)	41
Bulgaria (PROPHON)	2
Canada (Canadian Hot 100)	42
France (SNEP)	83
Germany (Official German Charts)	76
Hungary (Dance Top 40)	73
Hungary (Rádiós Top 40)	52
Hungary (Single Top 40)	27
Iceland (Plötutíóindi)	29
Ireland (IRMA)	32
Netherlands (Dutch Top 40)	74
New Zealand (Recorded Music NZ)	38
Slovenia (SloTop50)	5
Sweden (Sverigetopplistan)	47
Switzerland (Schweizer Hitparade)	60
Russia (Tophit)	44
UK Singles (Official Charts Company)	10
US Billboard Hot 100	33
US Adult Contemporary (Billboard)	4
US Adult Top 40 (Billboard)	18
US Hot Rock Songs (Billboard)	2
US Rock Airplay (Billboard)	7
Venezuela Airplay (Monitor Latino)	62

2024 year-end chart performance for "Feel It Still"
Chart (2024)	Position
Belarus Airplay (TopHit)	187

=== Decade-end charts ===
Chart (2010–2019)	Position
US Hot Rock Songs (Billboard)	8

== Certifications ==
Region	Certification	Certified units/sales
Australia (ARIA)	6× Platinum	420,000^{‡}
Austria (IFPI Austria)	2× Platinum	60,000^{‡}
Belgium (BRMA)	Platinum	20,000^{‡}
Canada (Music Canada)	8× Platinum	640,000^{‡}
Denmark (IFPI Danmark)	Platinum	90,000^{‡}
France (SNEP)	Diamond	233,333^{‡}
Germany (BVMI)	3× Gold	600,000^{‡}
Italy (FIMI)	Platinum	50,000^{‡}
New Zealand (RMNZ)	8× Platinum	240,000^{‡}
Poland (ZPAV)	Diamond	100,000^{‡}
Portugal (AFP)	Platinum	10,000^{‡}
Spain (Promusicae)	2× Platinum	120,000^{‡}
Switzerland (IFPI Switzerland)	2× Platinum	40,000^{‡}
United Kingdom (BPI)	4× Platinum	2,400,000^{‡}
United States (RIAA)	7× Platinum	7,000,000^{‡}
^{‡} Sales+streaming figures based on certification alone.

== Release history ==
Region	Date	Format	Label	Ref.
Various	March 3, 2017	Digital download	Atlantic	
United States	August 1, 2017	Contemporary hit radio	Atlantic	

== See also ==
- List of Billboard number-one alternative singles of the 2010s
- List of Billboard number-one adult alternative singles of the 2010s
