= Censored Colors =

2008 studio album by Portugal. The Man

Studio album by Portugal. The Man
- Released: September 16, 2008
- Recorded: January 2008
- Genre: Psychedelic rock; progressive rock
- Length: 53:11
- Label: Equal Vision Records; Approaching AIRballoons
- Producer: Kirk Huffman, Phillip Peterson, Paul Q. Kolderie

Portugal. The Man chronology
Church Mouth (2007)	Censored Colors (2008)	The Satanic Satanist (2009)

Professional ratings
Review scores
Source	Rating
AllMusic	3.5/5 stars
Alternative Press	4.5/5 stars
PopMatters	3.5/5 stars
World of Music	4/5 stars

Censored Colors is the third studio album by American rock band Portugal. The Man. The album was released through a partnership with Equal Vision Records on September 16, 2008. This partnership is not a traditional record contract, as the band "could work at their own pace and be intimately involved in all factors of their recording career."

The album leaked onto the Internet on August 25, 2008. The following day, the band posted a blog entry discussing the leak and their support of music downloading, encouraging their fans to download, share, and give feedback about the album.

== Track listing ==
All tracks are written by John Baldwin Gourley.

No.	Title	Length
1.	"Lay Me Back Down"	3:49
2.	"Colors"	5:02
3.	"And I"	5:39
4.	"Salt"	4:17
5.	"Created"	2:52
6.	"Out and In and In and Out"	4:46
7.	"Intermission"	1:49
8.	"New Orleans"	5:03
9.	"Never Pleased"	3:46
10.	"Sit Back and Dream"	1:20
11.	"Hard Times"	2:34
12.	"Our Times"	1:45
13.	"All Mine"	3:46
14.	"1989"	4:12
15.	"Our Way"	2:31

== Personnel ==
Portugal. The Man

- John Baldwin Gourley – vocals, guitar, organ, drum machines
- Zachary Carothers – bass guitar, backing vocals
- Jason Sechrist – drums, backing vocals
- Ryan Neighbors – organ, synthesizer, piano, vocals, Fender Rhodes

Technical personnel

- Kirk Huffman – production, engineering
- Phillip Peterson – production, engineering, arranging
- Paul Q. Kolderie – production, mixing
- Adam Taylor – production, mixing
- Ian Kennedy – mastering
- Rich Holtzman – management

Additional musicians

- Matt Clifford – slide guitar
- Kirk Huffman – guitar, percussion, vocals
- Thomas Hunter – slide guitar
- Garrett Lunceford – percussion
- Victoria Parker – violin
- Aaron Perrino – vocals, moog synthesizer
- Zoe Manville – vocals
- Charles Peterson – shouts
- Philip Peterson – synthesizer, harmonica, percussion, trombone, trumpet, accordion, cello, harp, vocals
- Anthony Saffery – sitar
- Ryan Sollee – vocals
