= 43 Things =

Social networking website

43things.com
- Website type: Social networking service
- Founded: January 1, 2005; 21 years ago
- Headquarters: Capitol Hill, Seattle, Washington
- Owner: The Robot Co-op
- Creator: The Robot Co-op
- Website: 43things.com
- Commercial: Yes
- Registration: Optional
- Current status: Offline since 1 January 2015; 11 years ago

43 Things was a social networking service established as an online goal setting community. It was built on the principles of tagging, rather than creating explicit interpersonal links (as seen in Friendster and Orkut).

== Overview ==
Users created accounts and then listed a number of goals or hopes; these goals were parsed by a lexer and connected to other people's goals that were constructed with similar words or ideas. This concept is also known as folksonomy. Users could set up to 43 goals, and were encouraged to explore the lists of other users and "cheer" them on towards achieving their goals. In 2005, 43 Things won the Webby Award for the best social networking service.

The 43 Things website went offline on New Years Day, 2015.

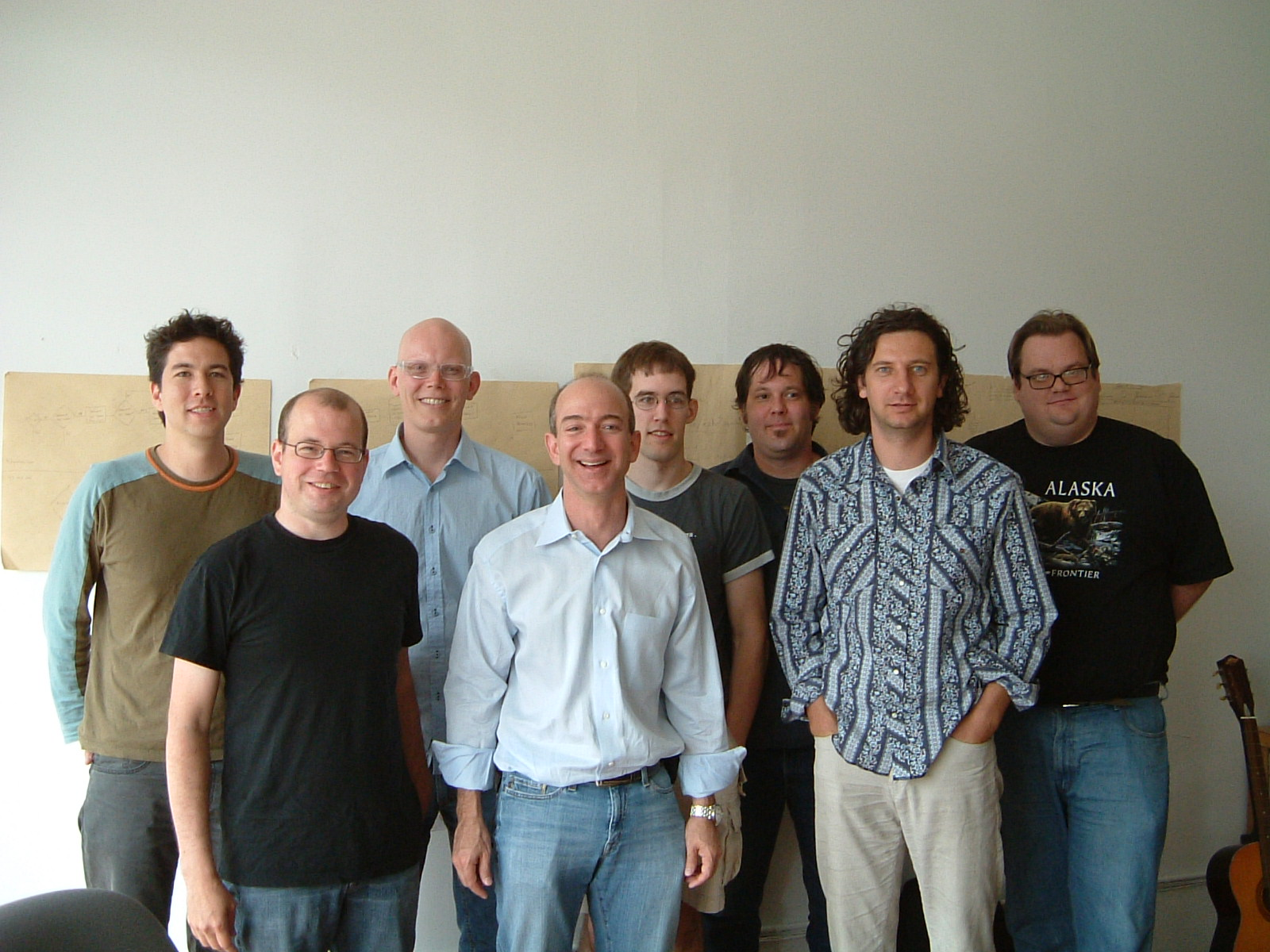
Jeff Bezos visits the Robot Co-op in 2005

== History ==
43 Things was launched on January 1, 2005, by the Robot Co-op, a small company based in Seattle founded by blogger and developer Buster Benson (né Erik Benson), Maktub keyboardist Daniel Spils, and former Amazon.com and Microsoft executive Josh Petersen. 43things.com became read-only on August 15, 2014, and shut down January 1, 2015.

== Critique ==
According to "43 Things: A Community Study," 43 Things had two shortcomings: (1) it failed to have a central area containing documentation about the website and (2) it relied heavily upon RSS, which is unfamiliar to a large portion of users. Regardless, it received solid reviews in regards to responsiveness and user suggestion integration.

== Awards ==
In 2005, 43 Things won the Webby Award for the best social networking service.
