= Portugal. The Man =

American rock band

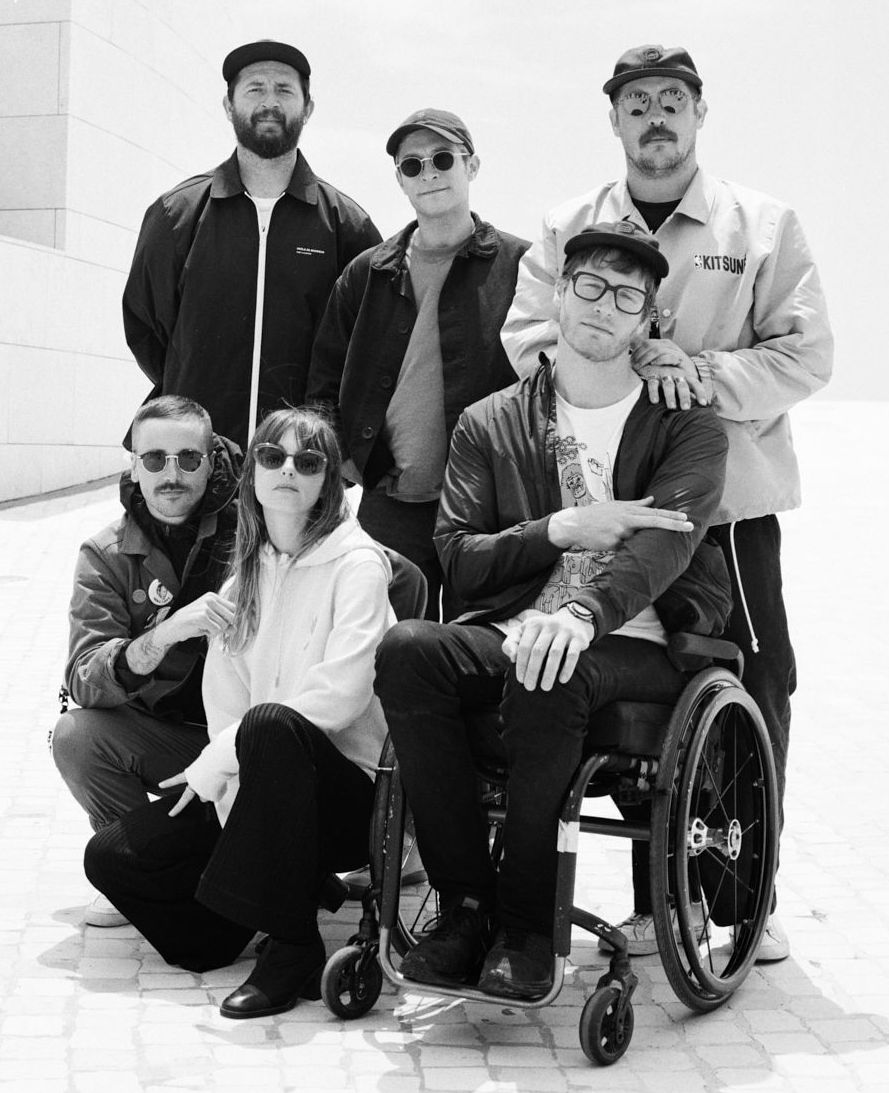
- Portugal. The Man in 2020

Background information
- Origin: Wasilla, Alaska, U.S.
- Genres: Alternative rock; psychedelic rock; psychedelic pop; experimental rock; indie rock
- Years active: 2004–present
- Labels: Fearless; Equal Vision; Atlantic; Approaching AIRballoons
- Members: John Gourley
- Past members: Zoe Manville; Nick Klein; Wesley Hubbard; Harvey Tumbleson; Jason Sechrist; Garrett Lunceford; Ryan Neighbors; Noah Gersh; Dewey Halpaus; Kane Ritchotte; Zachary Carothers; Kyle O'Quin; Eric Howk
- Website: portugaltheman.com

Portugal. The Man is an American rock band from Wasilla, Alaska, and based in Portland, Oregon. The group currently consists of founding member John Gourley, joined by a group of touring musicians for live performances. Gourley and co-founding bassist Zach Carothers met and began playing music together in 2001 at Wasilla High School.

The group released two albums on Fearless Records, and then released three albums on their own label Approaching AIRballoons in a partnership with Equal Vision Records, then moved to Atlantic Records in 2010, with whom they released four full-length albums. They are best known for their 2017 single "Feel It Still", which won Best Pop Duo/Group Performance at the 60th Annual Grammy Awards.

== History ==
=== Origin (2002–2006) ===
About August 2002, the band Anatomy of a Ghost was formed by John Gourley, Joe Simon, Dewey Halpaus, Nick Simon, and Zach Carothers. Gourley fronted the band having had no previous singing experience. Anatomy of A Ghost quickly gained popularity, but before long the group broke up. Portugal. The Man was originally started as Gourley's side project and Carothers played bass. Before they had a drummer, they used drum machines and synth-loops as a backing beat.

Gourley and Carothers teamed with Wesley Hubbard, Nick Klein (former guitar tech for Anatomy of a Ghost) and Harvey Tumbleson forming the band, Portugal. The Man. They left Wasilla and went to Portland with the intent to record and tour. The band recorded demos in the summer of 2004, and went on a US tour in the fall. In spring 2005, Klein and Tumbleson left and Jason Sechrist joined the band a little later. Portugal. The Man's debut record Waiter: "You Vultures!" was released by Fearless Records on January 24, 2006. The album was produced by Casey Bates.

The band's name is based on an idea of David Bowie's "larger than life" fame. They wanted the band to have a bigger-than-life feel but did not want to name it after one of their members. "A country is a group of people," guitar player and vocalist John Gourley said. "With Portugal, it just ended up being the first country that came to mind. The band's name is 'Portugal'. The period is stating that, and 'The Man' states that it's just one person" (any one of the band members). Gourley is saying that the country name they picked represents a person but not a specific member.

The name has a more personal meaning as well: Portugal. The Man refers to the name of a book which Gourley has planned to write about his father and his father's many adventures.

=== Independent years (2007–2010) ===
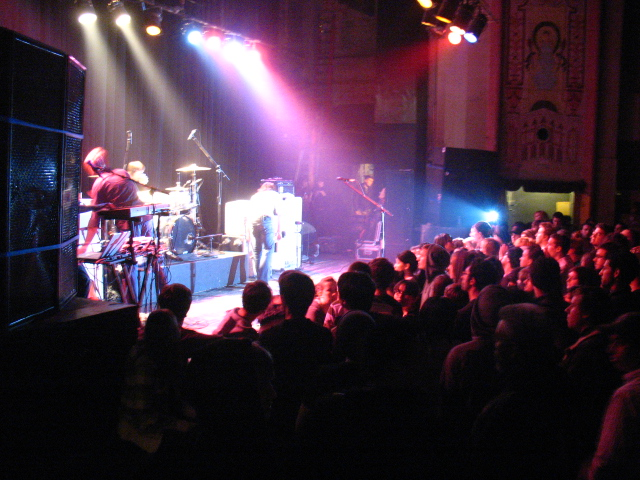
Portugal. The Man performs at the Phoenix Theatre in downtown Petaluma, California, May 2008

On July 24, 2007, they released their second full-length album, Church Mouth, again produced by Casey Bates, and set out on their own U.S. tour with support from The Photo Atlas, Play Radio Play, Tera Melos and The Only Children among other bands. Then they toured Europe and had another US tour with opening acts Rocky Votolato and Great Depression during September and October. After that tour, they joined Thursday, a post-hardcore band, on a short east coast tour in November alongside Circle Takes The Square.

In 2008, the band left Fearless Records and added Ryan Neighbors, their touring keyboardist, as an official member and a replacement for Wes Hubbard. On July 30, 2008, it was announced that Portugal. The Man was releasing Censored Colors under its own independent record label, Approaching AIRballoons, in partnership with Equal Vision Records. It was released August 1. Zoe Manville, a musician and graphic designer, was involved with the album and has been involved on all albums since 2008 including as a vocalist on many of the tracks on Woodstock. John Gourley was chosen as the 2008 Alternative Press "Best Vocalist of the Year".

In 2009, Portugal. The Man played at Bonnaroo in Manchester, Tennessee and at Lollapalooza in Chicago. Their fourth album, The Satanic Satanist, came out on July 21, 2009. Themed around memories and stories from Gourley's youth in Alaska, the album was recorded with the help of record producer Paul Q. Kolderie. The band's fifth studio album, American Ghetto, was released on March 2, 2010. Before the album was released the band did not seek reviews, publicity, or airplay before the release date and no one received the album early. Gourley and Carothers grew up listening to The Beatles' songs

=== In the Mountain In the Cloud (2010–2012) ===
In April 2010, Portugal. The Man announced their signing to Atlantic Records. During the summer of 2010, the band recorded an album, In the Mountain In the Cloud, with producer John Hill in El Paso, Texas; London; and San Diego. Andy Wallace mixed the album.

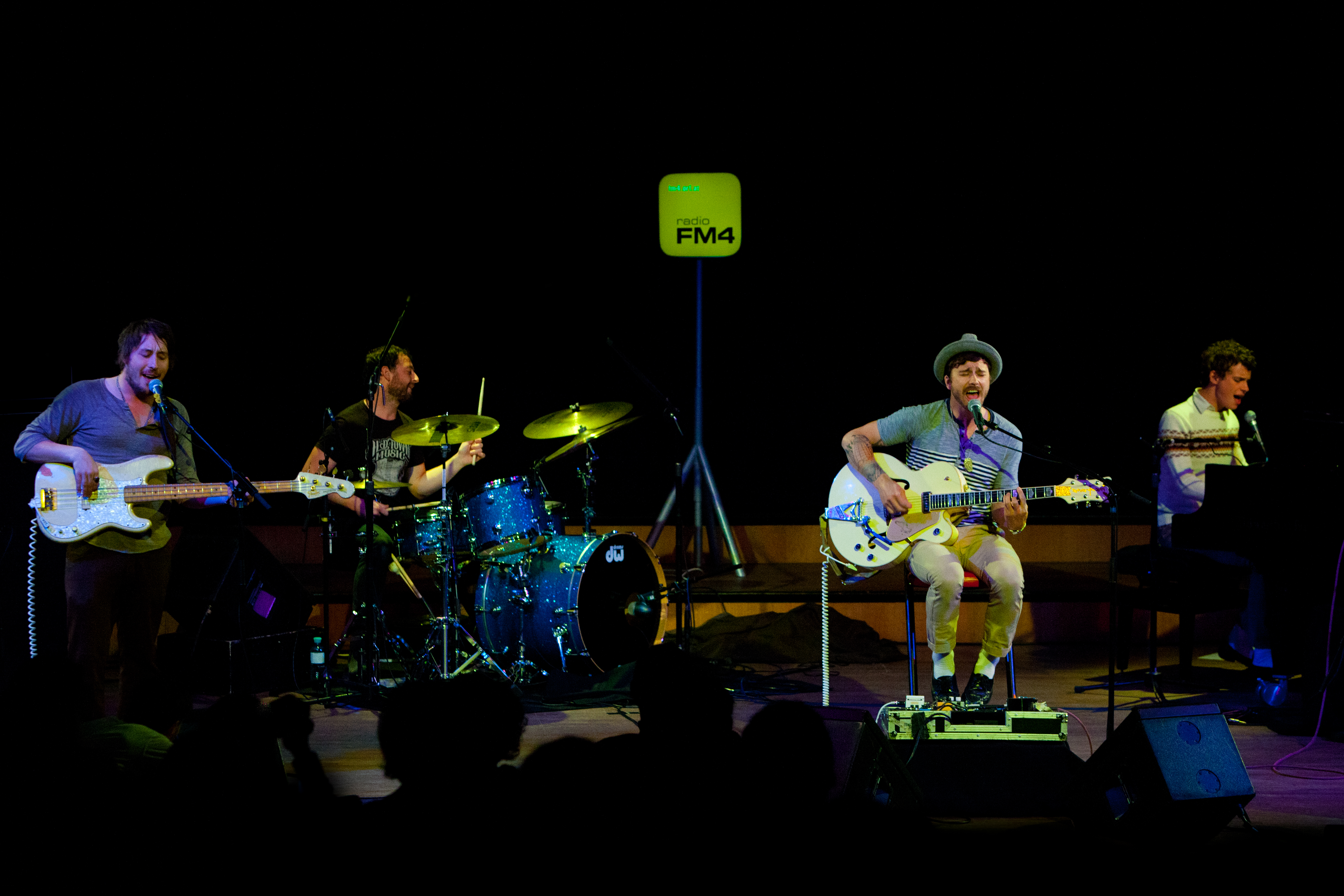
Portugal. The Man performing on FM4 in Vienna, April 2011

Starting in April 2011, Portugal. The Man began releasing one 30-second clip every week from their new album via their YouTube channel, with a 13-minute short film "Sleep Forever", directed by Michael Ragen, premiered in June of that year. The full album, In the Mountain in the Cloud, was released on July 19, 2011. Portugal. The Man made their second appearance at Bonnaroo for the festival's 10th anniversary in June 2011, as well as another Lollapalooza appearance in August. On August 8, 2011, after their Lollapalooza show, the band's van and trailer were stolen. The van was recovered the next day, but the contents of the trailer (the band's instruments and gear) were lost. A list of the missing equipment was released by the band. John Gourley said, "... every bit of money Portugal. The Man has made over the last five years was in that trailer." Four days after the theft, much of the band's gear was recovered from the home of a man who claimed to have purchased it at a flea market. The band posted a thank you note on its website: "it is more than just a win for PTM, it is also a win for Twitter, the world of social media, the Chicago police, and old school journalism." The man was charged with one felony count of theft for buying the stolen equipment.

In late 2011, Portugal. The Man went on a US tour and guitarist Noah Gersh joined the band. They went on tour in Europe in January 2012, opening for The Black Keys before going to Melbourne, Australia to headline and perform at St Jerome's Laneway Festival. In the spring of 2012, they headlined the Norman Music Festival in Norman, Oklahoma as well as the Jägermeister Music Tour with an indie band, The Lonely Forest. Ryan Neighbors left the group in April 2012, to pursue his own music career with his new project Hustle and Drone, and was replaced by Kyle O'Quin on keyboards. Jason Sechrist was replaced by former child actor and drummer Kane Ritchotte from DEV2.0 shortly after Neighbors' departure.

=== Evil Friends (2013–2014) ===
The band's seventh album, Evil Friends, was released on June 4, 2013, preceded by a single of the same name in March 2013. Produced by Danger Mouse and featuring guest appearances from Este and Danielle Haim, the album was influenced by Pink Floyd and specifically by Pink Floyd's album, The Dark Side of the Moon. A music video of "Purple Yellow Red and Blue" came out. Later in 2013, singles from Evil Friends including "Evil Friends" and "Purple, Yellow, Red and Blue", were remixed by artists including Bear Mountain, Terry Urban and the band Passion Pit.

=== Woodstock and "Feel It Still" (2014–2020) ===
In November 2014, Portugal. The Man recorded their eighth album with Mike D from The Beastie Boys as their producer. The band posted pictures of the band in the studio with Mike D on their Instagram as well as small teasers of upcoming songs. Mac Miller was shown working with the band. During that time, guitarist Eric Howk, formerly from The Lashes, joined the band. Howk, who grew up with Gourley and Carothers in Wasilla, had been talking with the band about joining them in 2007; however, an accident on May 5, 2007, left him a paraplegic and he unofficially tabled a decision. The first week of May 2015, the band released teasers on social networks of what seemed to be new music with a Latin twist with huapango guitars from Mexico, synths, and drum machines. On May 5, Portugal. The Man released a Spanish version of "Purple Yellow Red and Blue" covered by a Mexican-American band named The Chamanas on their official YouTube channel to celebrate Cinco de Mayo.

On December 31, 2015, Portugal. The Man posted to their website that they had completed two records, each with a hashtag #Gloomin + #Doomin, respectively. But on February 3, 2016, the band tweeted that the new record would be called Gloomin + Doomin. In February 2016, Portugal. The Man were featured on the Yoko Ono collaboration album Yes, I'm A Witch Too performing "Soul Got Out of the Box". On November 30, 2016, Triple J radio debuted Portugal. The Man's new song "Noise Pollution". It was released as a single, "Noise Pollution [Version A, Vocal Up Mix 1.3]", on December 2, and featured Mary Elizabeth Winstead and Zoe Manville. On March 3, 2017, the band released a single titled "Feel It Still" off their eighth studio album, Woodstock. The release was followed by an accompanying music video three days later. It was revealed that Gloomin + Doomin was never finished and was thrown away three years later.

The album's title was inspired by an original 1969 Woodstock music festival ticket stub owned by Gourley's father. It led Gourley to a realization that almost 50 years later, music has the same mission as then–"to comment on societal and political unease." "We worked with so many rad people on this album, but ended up with just the four of us in a basement at 4 a.m. trying to say something that mattered," said Gourley. "Trying to write music that would help people feel they're not alone, even if they're angry or feeling lost." Woodstock was released on June 16, 2017. The band caused some controversy during their performance of "Feel It Still" at the American Music Awards in November 2017 because of their backdrop that read: "No computers up here, just live instruments." Critics felt that the implication was that bands who use backing tracks were less artistically relevant than ones who used only live instruments.

"Feel It Still" became the band's biggest hit single to date in the United States, reaching No. 1 on the Billboard Alternative Songs, Hot 100 Airplay, and Pop Songs charts and becoming a Top 5 hit on the Billboard Hot 100. On January 28, 2018, "Feel It Still" won Best Pop Duo/Group Performance at the 60th Annual Grammy Awards and then won the Alternative Rock Song of the Year at the 2018 iHeartRadio Music Awards in Inglewood, California. The band also received the ASCAP Vanguard Award at the ASCAP Pop Music Awards in April 2018. "Live in the Moment" became a number one track on the Billboard Alternative Songs chart during the week of March 26, 2018. It additionally gained the honor of the track with the most spins (plays) during a week's time, that has ever been recorded on Alternative radio at 3,503. In February 2018, the band embarked on a world tour in support of Woodstock and went to North America, Europe, and Australia ending in October 2018. Before each show on the tour, the band was introduced with a video featuring the Mike Judge characters Beavis and Butt-Head.

In support of their album, the band has appeared on numerous television programs. In July and August 2017, they played "Feel It Still" on The Tonight Show Starring Jimmy Fallon and Conan, respectively. The latter show featured a four-piece string section. In September 2017, it played "Feel It Still" on The Ellen DeGeneres Show and returned to that program in March 2018, playing "Live in the Moment" with the USC marching band. In February 2018, Portugal. The Man appeared on The Late Show with Stephen Colbert playing "Live In The Moment" with backing from the PS22 Children's Chorus and the BKSteppers drumline. In April 2018, the group performed "Feel It Still" and "Live in the Moment" with a string quartet on Jimmy Kimmel Live!. In May 2018, the band played "Live In The Moment" again, this time on The Late Late Show with James Corden.

=== Chris Black Changed My Life and Shish (2021–present) ===
On April 16, 2021, the band released Oregon City Sessions, a live album recorded in December 2008 in a studio in Oregon City, Oregon. The band contributed a Metallica cover, "Don't Tread on Me" to the charity tribute album The Metallica Blacklist, released in September 2021.

On March 1, 2023, the band released "Dummy", the first single off their upcoming ninth studio album, Chris Black Changed My Life. Produced by Jeff Bhasker and dedicated to a late friend of the band, the album was released by Atlantic Records on June 23, 2023. It will be supported by a tour beginning in June 2023 at Bonnaroo Music Festival. Prior to its release as a single, the song received significant attention after it was featured in a Taco Bell commercial. In 2023, drummer Jason Sechrist left the band after having rejoined in 2016.

In 2024, they were the guest stars from the children's television on Yo Gabba Gabbaland. They appeared in episode 2 Make and performed Art Party.

From April 12 through 19, 2025, they performed the song "Rainbow Connection" along with Paul Williams and Weird Al Yankovic in Yo Gabba Gabba Coachella.

On November 7, 2025, the band released Shish, their tenth studio album, on Thirty Tigers. It includes the singles "Denali", "Tanana" and "Mush". Their first album after leaving Atlantic Records earlier that year, it marks a shift to a much heavier sound reminiscent of their early work. The name of the album is in reference to Shishmaref, Alaska. The cover of the album features a photo taken in Shishmaref in the 1950s or 1960s.

During their fall tour supporting the release of the album Shish, the band added several "intimate" venues supplemental to their large venue bookings. Among these were the Troubadour in West Hollywood, which they performed at on November 14, 2025.

== Music videos and short films ==
On June 6, 2011, Portugal. The Man released a short film featuring the songs "Sleep Forever" and "Got It All (This Can't Be Living Now)" from their album, In The Mountain In the Cloud. Produced by Richard Hutchins and directed by Michael Ragen, the film has clips of Alaskan wilderness intertwined with scenes of John Gourley dog sledding before he is forced to travel by foot after his dogs abandon him.

Portugal. The Man has released music videos for their songs "So American", "People Say", "All Your Light", "Do You", "The Dead Dog", "AKA M80 the Wolf", "Lay Me Back Down", "The Sun", "Evil Friends", "Purple Yellow Red and Blue", "Atomic Man", and "Modern Jesus". A video for "Noise Pollution" came out on December 1, 2016.

The video for "Feel It Still" was released on March 6, 2017 and received attention for its imagery of a burning newspaper titled Info Wars. The video features Gourley walking through a post-apocalyptic wasteland and was directed by Ian Schwartz. It contains about 30 "hidden Easter eggs." Clicking on certain items at specific times in the video provides viewers with links to web pages described as "tools for resistance." For example, one shot shows a couple engaging in sex. By clicking the Easter egg, viewers are taken to the Planned Parenthood site. Other Easter egg links include a video describing a protestor's legal rights, a direct phone call to the White House, and links for buying custom-designed protest posters and graffiti stencil kits. The YouTube video has over 355,000,000 views.

== Activism ==
Throughout the band's history, it has engaged in political activism and philanthropy in various forms. On April 22, 2014, the band announced a partnership with the Smithsonian's National Zoo and Conservation Biology Institute, which is part of the Smithsonian, to release a limited-edition run of 400 vinyl records aimed at raising awareness for the critically endangered Sumatran tiger species, of which only 400 remained in the wild at the time. A song, "Sumatran Tiger", was released only in its vinyl form rather than on digital platforms. Individual copies were sent by mail to "400 carefully chosen influencers, among them actors, activists, musicians, conservationists, bloggers, and journalists." The band said that the song was the first "meant to go extinct unless it's reproduced." Recordings of the song were online on the internet with the hashtags #EndangeredSong and #SumatranTiger. The "Endangered Song", as it was also known, won a Bronze Award at the 2014 Clio Music Awards in Manhattan, New York. In 2015, the band partnered with StubHub and Dr. Martens to help raise $1 million to put instruments in schools throughout the United States. The initiative was carried out in partnership with the Mr. Holland's Opus Foundation and focused on schools and institutions with limited funding. In June 2016, the band headlined the Gleason Fest, an indie music festival which raises money for the ALS non-profit, Gleason Initiative Foundation.

In August 2017, Portugal. The Man donated all proceeds from its Charlottesville, Virginia show to the Charlottesville Area Community Foundation in response to the Unite the Right rally which preceded the vehicular homicide of activist Heather Heyer. In May 2018, the band canceled a planned appearance on the Australian TV program, Sunrise, after racist statements made by guest panelist Prue MacSween caused controversy. In July 2018, during shows in Oregon, Portugal. The Man helped raise mental health awareness in partnership with Logan Lynn's public advocacy campaign, Keep Oregon Well. The band is a partner with the non-profit organization, HeadCount, whose goal is to promote "participation in democracy" often by helping concertgoers register to vote. In September 2018, the band helped raise $20,000 for a benefit supporting Noise For Now in Birmingham, Alabama.

In 2019, the band received the Legend Award at the Native American Music Awards in Niagara Falls, New York. In January 2020, it was honored with the Public Sector Leadership Award from the National Congress of American Indians at a banquet in Washington, D.C. Both awards were given in recognition of the band's activism and advocacy for Indigenous rights, including for the land acknowledgement statements which were made before every show on the group's international tour. Also in early 2020, Portugal. The Man founded the PTM Foundation, a non-profit charitable organization that primarily focuses on funding causes related to Indigenous peoples' communities. The organization also aims to work toward the improvement of mental health issues, environmental issues, disability rights, and human rights through advocacy, philanthropy, community involvement, and increased awareness. In response to the Matanuska-Susitna Borough School District board voting to remove five "controversial" books from the school curriculum in May 2020, the PTM Foundation offered to buy those books for any student in the district who requested copies. The foundation raised $93,000 in grants in 2022, which were distributed to 40 different tribes, impact organizations, and community groups.

In the 2020 U.S. presidential campaign, the band endorsed Vermont Senator Bernie Sanders in the Democratic Party presidential primaries and played at Iowa rallies of his in Sioux City and Ames and one in Tacoma, Washington.

In 2021 John and Zoe Gourley's daughter Frances was diagnosed with a rare disease called DHDDS. The band launched a second charitable foundation at that time, Frances Changed My Life, and began raising awareness and funding to support research and treatment for Frances and other kids and families navigating rare diseases.

== Awards and nominations ==
Year	Awards	Work	Category	Result
2013	UK Music Video Awards	"Modern Jesus"	Best Rock/Indie Video – International	Nominated
2014	World Music Awards	Evil Friends	World's Best Album	Nominated
2014	Clio Music Awards	"Endangered Song"	Bronze Award for Innovative Media	Won
2017	Electronic Music Awards	"Feel It Still" (Medasin Remix)	Remix of the Year	Nominated
2017	UK Music Video Awards	"Rich Friends"	Best Interactive Video	Nominated
2017	LOS40 Music Awards	Themselves	Blackjack Artist Award	Won
2017	Cannes Lions International Festival of Creativity	"Feel It Still"	Bronze Lion	Won
2018	Grammy Awards	"Feel It Still"	Best Pop Duo/Group Performance	Won
2018	Billboard Music Awards	"Feel It Still"	Top Rock Song	Nominated
2018	Billboard Music Awards	Woodstock	Top Rock Album	Nominated
2018	Billboard Music Awards	Themselves	Top Rock Artist	Nominated
2018	ASCAP Pop Awards	Themselves	Vanguard Awards	Won
2018	New Music Awards	Themselves	TOP40 Group of the Year	Won
2018	Pollstar Concert Industry Awards	Themselves	Best New Headliner	Won
2018	iHeartRadio Music Awards	Themselves	Duo/Group of the Year	Nominated
2018	iHeartRadio Music Awards	Themselves	Alternative Rock Artist of the Year	Nominated
2018	iHeartRadio Music Awards	"Feel It Still"	Alternative Rock Song of the Year	Won
2018	Teen Choice Awards	"Feel It Still"	Choice Song: Group	Nominated
2018	Teen Choice Awards	Themselves	Choice Rock Artist	Nominated
2018	Webby Awards	"Feel It Still"	Online Film & Video – Best Use of Interactive Video	Won
2019	Global Awards	"Feel It Still"	Best Song	Nominated
2019	iHeartRadio Music Awards	Themselves	Alternative Rock Artist of the Year	Nominated
2019	Hungarian Music Awards	Woodstock	International Modern Pop-Rock Album of the Year	Nominated
2019	Native American Music Awards	Themselves	Legend Award	Won
2020	NCAI Leadership Awards	Themselves	Public Sector Leadership Award	Won

== Band members ==
Current members

- John Gourley – lead vocals, guitar, bass, keyboards, drum machine (2004–present)

Current touring musicians

- Ryan Wiggans – trumpet (2024–present)
- Liv Slingerland – guitar (2024–present)
- David Marion – backing vocals (2025–present)
- Tilley Komorny – bass guitar, backing vocals (2023 – 2024, 2026 – present)
- Vincent LiRocchi – drums (2026–present)

Former members

- Zoe Manville – backing vocals, percussion (2008–2026)
- Zach Carothers – bass, percussion, backing vocals (2004–2024)
- Nick Klein – guitar (2004–2005)
- Wesley Hubbard – keyboards, backing vocals (2004–2006)
- Harvey Tumbleson – beats, programming, beatboxing (2004–2005)
- Jason Sechrist – drums, percussion, backing vocals (2005–2008, 2009–2011, 2014–2023)
- Kyle O'Quin – keyboards, guitar, backing vocals (2007, 2012–2025)
- Ryan Neighbors – keyboards, didgeridoo, backing vocals (2008–2012)
- Garrett Lunceford – drums (2008–2009)
- Kane Ritchotte – drums, percussion, backing vocals (2012–2013, 2025)
- Noah Gersh – guitar, backing vocals, percussion (2011–2013)
- Eric Howk – guitar, bass, backing vocals (2015–2025)

Former touring musicians

- Kirk Ohnstad – beats
- Dewey Halpaus – guitar (2005–2008)
- Matthew Moore – guitar (2008–2011)
- Redray Frazier – backing vocals, acoustic guitar (2023–2024)
- Vincent LiRocchi – drums (2023)
- Machado Mijiga – saxophone, keyboards (2023)
- Joe Mengis – drums (2023–2024)
- Dani Bell – bass, backing vocals (2025)
- Nick Reinhart – guitar (2013–2015, 2025)

== Discography ==
Studio albums

- Waiter: "You Vultures!" (2006)
- Church Mouth (2007)
- Censored Colors (2008)
- The Satanic Satanist (2009)
- American Ghetto (2010)
- In the Mountain in the Cloud (2011)
- Evil Friends (2013)
- Woodstock (2017)
- Chris Black Changed My Life (2023)
- Shish (2025)
