= The Lashes =

Power pop band

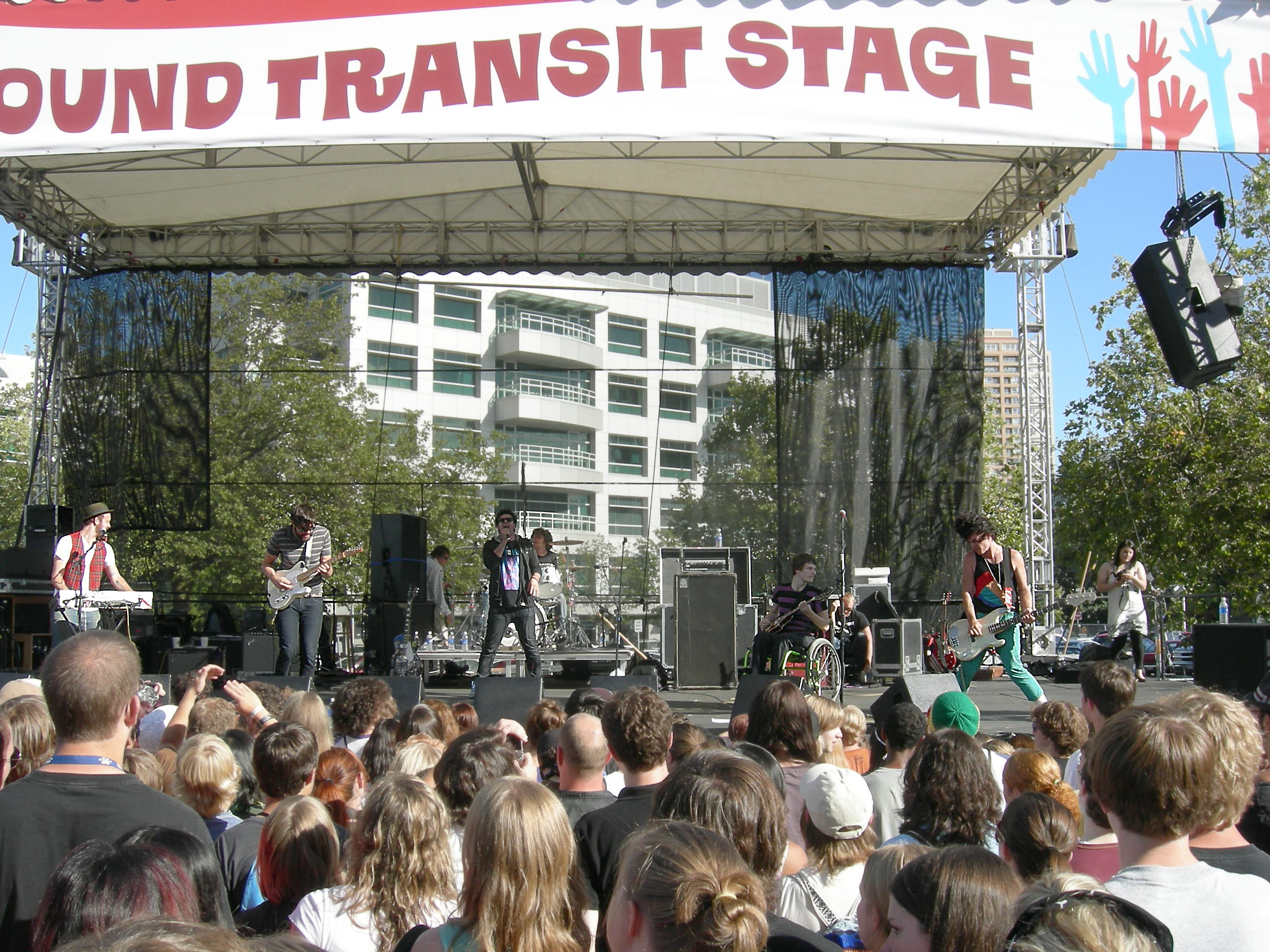
- The Lashes at Bumbershoot 2007

Background information
- Origin: Seattle, Washington, United States
- Genres: Power pop
- Years active: 2000–2008
- Labels: Lookout! Red Ink; Columbia
- Members: Ben Clark; Nat Mooter; Eric Howk; Scotty Rickard; Jacob Hoffman; Mike Loggins
- Website: Official site

The Lashes were a Seattle-based power pop band that formed in 2000 and became inactive in 2008.

In 2004, the Lashes released the Stupid Stupid EP, produced by John Goodmanson, on Lookout! Records. Goodmanson also produced their debut album, Get It, released by Columbia Records in 2006.

On May 5, 2007, Lashes guitarist Eric Howk fell into a 12-foot-deep (3.7 m) hole at a construction site near a friend's house and broke several vertebrae and severed his spine. The accident left him paralyzed from the waist down. On May 17, 2007, the McLeod Residence hosted a benefit for Howk. Donations collected at the event raised money to help cover his medical bills.

The band has been inactive since 2008. The band's lead singer, Ben Lashes, went on to become a talent manager.

== Discography ==
- The Stupid Stupid (EP) (Lookout! Records, 2004)
- Get It (Columbia Records, 2006)
- Thank You Side A (EP) 2008
