= John Gourley =

American musician, singer, and songwriter (born 1981)

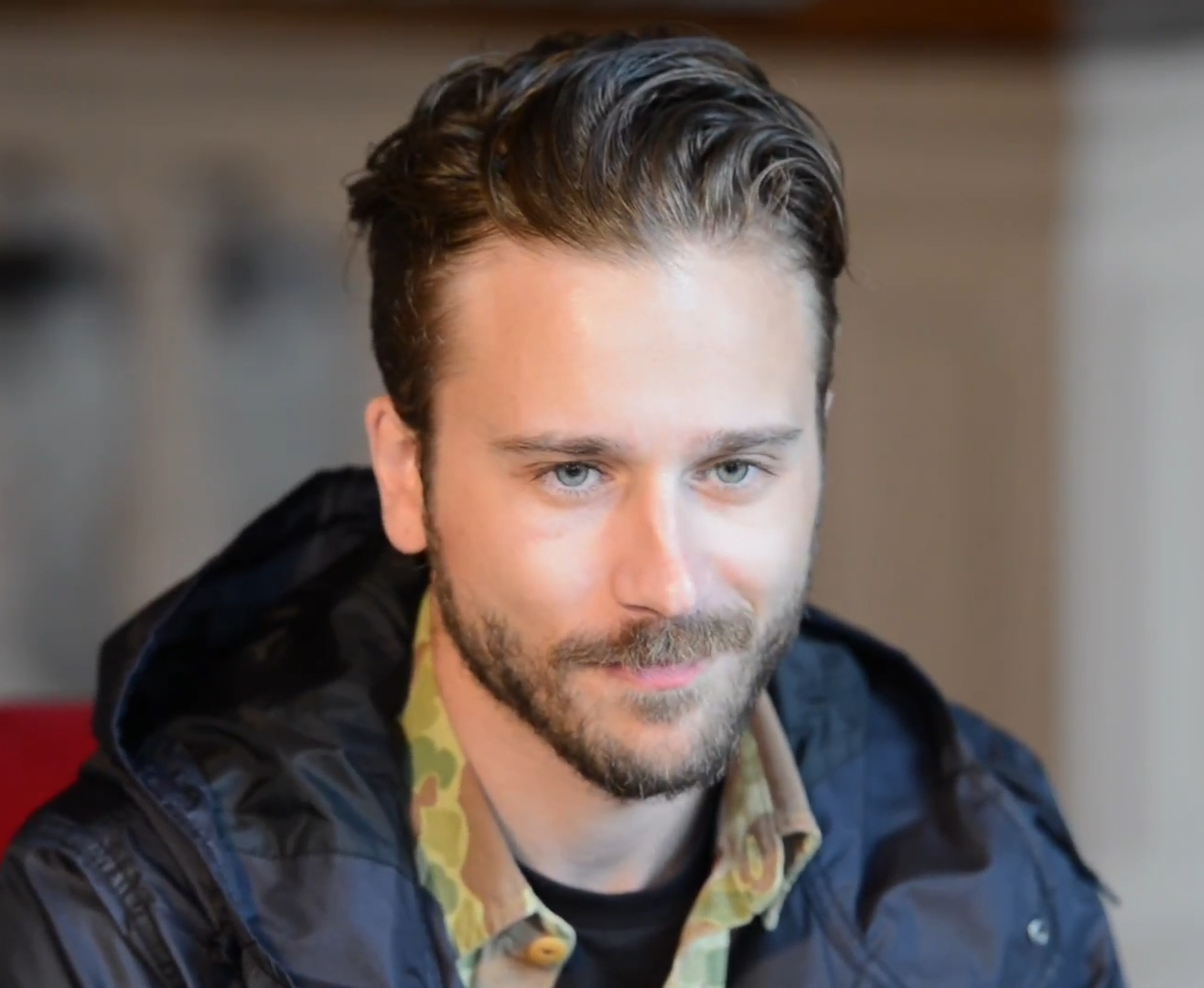
- Gourley in May 2013
- Born: John Baldwin Gourley; June 12, 1981 (age 45); Willow, Alaska, U.S.
- Other name: The Fantastic The
- Occupations: Musician; singer; songwriter; visual artist
- Years active: 2002–present
- Partners: Zoe Manville
- Children: 1
- Musical career
- Origin: Portland, Oregon, U.S.
- Genres: Alternative rock; psychedelic rock; psychedelic pop; experimental rock; indie rock; post-hardcore
- Instruments: Vocals; guitar; bass; keyboards; drums
- Member of: Portugal. The Man
- Formerly of: Anatomy of a Ghost

John Baldwin Gourley (born June 12, 1981) is an American musician, singer, and songwriter from Alaska. He is the founder, lead singer and rhythm guitarist of the rock band Portugal. The Man, with the hit song "Feel It Still". Gourley was previously the lead singer in post-hardcore band Anatomy of a Ghost. Gourley is also a visual artist, who often uses the alias The Fantastic The.

== Early life ==
Gourley was born in 1981 in Willow, Alaska, to John T. Gourley and Jennifer Van Ingen. He and his two siblings grew up in Alaska moving from town to town, wherever their father's contracting business took the family. Gourley's parents both competed in the Iditarod, and for a while the family lived in a remote "off the grid" cabin accessible only by dogsled. He grew up helping to take care of dozens of mushing dogs.

He attended Wasilla High School, but dropped out at age 15 to study at home and work in construction with his father.

== Career ==
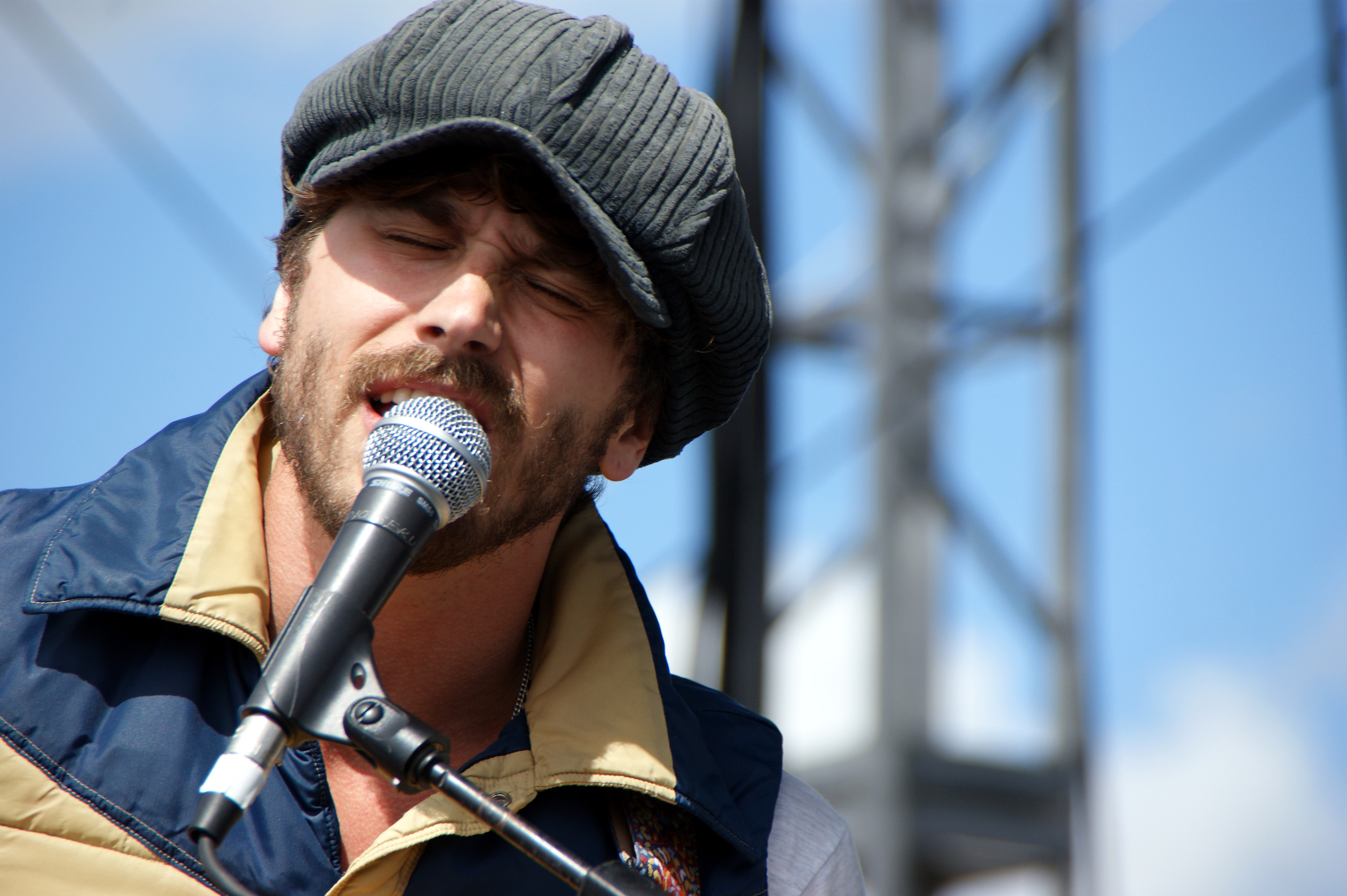
John Gourley at 2010 Sasquatch! Festival

Gourley joined four fellow Wasilla musicians: his best friend Zach Carothers and the three members of band Nice Guy Eddie (Dewey Helpaus, Joe Simon, and Nick Simon), to form punk band Anatomy of a Ghost in 2002. They toured across the country and released their album Evanesce in October 2003 on Fearless Records.

In the spring of 2003, Gourley recorded vocals for the song "Motelroom.Grandpiano" with the band Fear Before on their first album, Odd How People Shake. The members of Anatomy of a Ghost wanted to pursue their own ideas, however, so the band split up in May 2004. Gourley and bassist Carothers formed Portugal. The Man.

Gourley has fronted Portugal. The Man since, and is the only continuous member in the band since bassist Zach Carothers departed in 2024. His wife, Zoe, has been a member since 2008 as a backing vocalist and percussionist. At the 60th Annual Grammy Awards in 2018, the band won the Best Pop Duo/Group Performance Grammy for their song "Feel It Still", which got to number four on the Billboard Hot 100 and topped the Hot Rock & Alternative Songs.

== Personal life ==
Gourley and longtime partner and bandmate Zoe Manville have a daughter born in 2011, who is afflicted with a very rare neurodegenerative disease. The disease is an extremely rare genetic mutation of the DHDDS gene, which at the time of her diagnoses in 2021 had only around 70 known people diagnosed worldwide.
