= Craven (surname) =

Craven is a surname that can be of English or Irish origin. In England, it is a topographical surname associated with the medieval kingdom or shire of Craven situated in West and North Yorkshire. In Ireland, Craven is the anglicisation of O’Crábháin, the descendant of Crabhan, a sept associated with the Ui Maine (anglicisation: Hy Many) tribe of Connaught, Ireland.

Notable people with the surname include:

- Avery Craven (1885–1980), American historian
- Beverley Craven (born 1963), British singer and songwriter
- Danie Craven (1910–1993), South African rugby union player, national coach, rugby administrator, academic and author
- Danny Craven (born 1967), former Australian rules footballer
- Danny Craven (rugby league) (born 1991), English rugby league player
- Dave Craven (born c. 1990), American politician
- Elizabeth Craven (née Berkeley; 1750–1828), British author and playwright
- Frank Craven (1875–1945), American stage and film actor, playwright, and screenwriter
- Greg Craven (academic) (born 1958), Vice-Chancellor of the Australian Catholic University
- Greg Craven (teacher), American climate change activist known for a YouTube viral video
- Henry Thornton Craven (1818–1905), English actor and dramatist
- Joan Craven (1897–1979), English photographer
- James Craven (disambiguation)
- John Craven (disambiguation)
- Joseph Craven (disambiguation)
- Kyle Craven (born 1989), American internet celebrity
- Lyndley Craven (1945–2014), Australian botanist
- M. W. Craven, English crime writer, winner of the 2019 Gold Dagger award
- Margaret Craven (politician) (born 1944), American state senator in Maine
- Margaret Craven (writer) (1901–1980), American author
- Matt Craven (born 1956), Canadian actor
- Murray Craven (born 1964), Canadian ice hockey player
- Peter Craven (1934–1963), English motorcycle racer
- Peter Craven (literary critic), Australian writer
- Philip Craven (born 1950), British sports administrator, president of the International Paralympic Committee
- Ricky Craven (born 1966), American NASCAR driver
- Robert Craven (born 1955), American politician
- Sydney Craven (born 1994), English actress
- Thomas Tingey Craven (rear admiral) (1808–1887), United States Navy officer who served in the Civil War
- Thomas Tingey Craven (US Navy admiral) (1873–1950), United States Navy officer who served in World Wars I and II, grandson of the above
- Tunis Craven (1813–1864), United States Navy officer, brother of Thomas Tingey Craven
- T.A.M. Craven (1893–1972), United States Navy officer and FCC commissioner
- Wes Craven (1939–2015), American film director
- William Craven (disambiguation)
