= Craven =

Craven may refer to:

- Medieval Craven, a Celtic polity in Northern England and part of the Hen Ogledd
  - Craven District, a local government district of North Yorkshire from 1974 to 2023

== Places ==
- Craven, New South Wales, Australia, see Mid-Coast Council#Towns and localities
- Craven, Saskatchewan, Canada, a village
- Craven (Bradford ward), an electoral ward in the Bradford Metropolitan District, West Yorkshire, England
- Craven, North Carolina, United States, see Gold Hill, North Carolina
- Craven, South Dakota, United States, see Aberdeen, South Dakota micropolitan area#Communities
- Craven Arms, Shropshire, England
- Craven County, North Carolina, United States
- Craven County, South Carolina, a former county in the United States

== Organisations ==
- Cravens, a British railway rolling stock builder
  - Craven Brothers, a British manufacturer of machine tools and cranes
- Craven College, North Yorkshire, England
- Craven Community College, with three campuses in North Carolina, US
- Craven Laboratories, a defunct American pesticide testing laboratory

== Ships ==
- USS Craven (TB-10), a torpedo boat commissioned in 1900 and decommissioned in 1913
- USS Craven (DD-70), a destroyer commissioned in 1918 and scrapped in 1945
- USS Craven (DD-382), a destroyer commissioned in 1937 and decommissioned in 1945

== Other uses ==
- Craven (surname)
- Craven, the pseudonym of John William Carleton (c. 1802 – 1856), an English editor and writer
- Earl of Craven, also Baron Craven, a title in English peerage
- Craven baronets, two extinct baronetcies, one in the Baronetage of England and the other in the Baronetage of the United Kingdom
- Craven Country Jamboree, a music festival, Craven, Saskatchewan, Canada

== See also ==
- Craven A and Craven, cigarette and tobacco brands produced by The House of Craven
- Craven Berkeley (1805–1855), British politician
- Craven Cottage, a sports stadium and home of Fulham F.C. in London, England
- Craven Fault System, a fault zone in northern England
- Craven Park (disambiguation)
- Craven Plate, an Australian thoroughbred horse race
- Craven Stakes, a British horse race
