= Disaster Girl =

Internet meme

The photograph, widely known as Disaster Girl, depicts a young girl staring into the camera while a house burns in front of her.

Disaster Girl is a meme photograph featuring a young girl staring at the camera with a house fire in front of her.

The girl in the photo, Zoë Roth, was four years old when the photo was taken in 2005.

== Photograph ==
The photograph depicts a four-year-old Zoë Roth in 2005, born in 2001, overlooking a structure fire while facing the camera, with her expression, described by The New York Times as "a devilish smirk" and "a knowing look in her eyes", jokingly implying that she was responsible for the fire.

== History ==
=== Conception ===
When Roth was four years old, in 2005, her family went to view a burning house that had been set for firefighter training in Mebane, North Carolina, United States.

The Roth family lived near a fire station in Mebane, North Carolina, and as they watched a house burning, Roth's father, an amateur photographer, took her picture. Her father entered it into a photo contest in 2007 and it won. The photo became famous in 2008 when it won an Emotion Capture contest in JPG magazine. Roth had given permission to use the image in educational material, but the photo had been used hundreds of times for various purposes, without the Roth family being in control.

=== Use as an internet meme ===
Disaster Girl spread as an internet meme, with many editing the photo to depict Roth overlooking historic disasters, such as the extinction of the dinosaurs or the sinking of the Titanic. Roth appreciated the spread of the meme, saying that she loves "seeing how creative people are", and that she is "super grateful for the entire experience" of being the subject of a viral meme.

=== Non-fungible token auction ===
After receiving an email in February 2021 suggesting she sell the meme as a non-fungible token (NFT) for as much as "six figures", Roth decided to sell an NFT of the photo. On April 17, 2021, Roth sold the NFT for 180 Ether, or US$486,716 to a collector identified only as @3FMusic. The Roth family retained copyright over the work, as well as an entitlement to 10 percent of proceeds when the NFT is resold. According to Roth, she sold the photograph to take control over its spread, after consulting Kyle Craven / Bad Luck Brian and Laney Griner, the mother of the child depicted in the Success Kid meme.

Roth used the proceeds of the auction to pay off her student loans after earning a BA in Peace, War, and Defense from the University of North Carolina at Chapel Hill.

== Reception ==
Marie Fazio of The New York Times described Disaster Girl as "a vital part of [internet] meme canon", considering it to be part of the internet meme "hall of fame", alongside the likes of Bad Luck Brian and Success Kid.
