= Quaker Square =

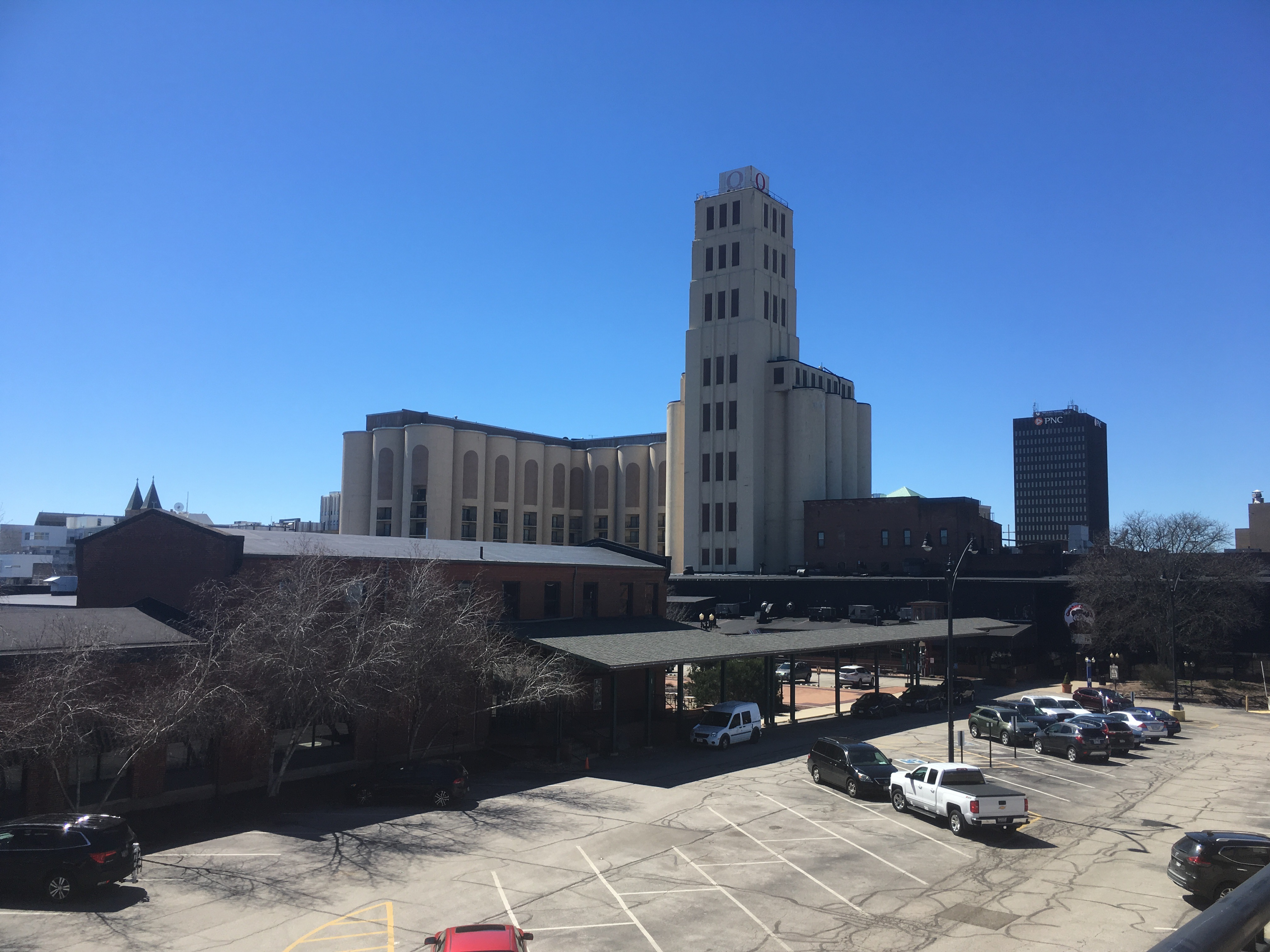
- Interactive map of the Quaker Square area

General information
- Type: Retail center
- Location: 135 South Broadway Street, University of Akron, Akron, Ohio, United States
- Completed: 1932
- Opening: 1975
- Closed: 2022
- Quaker Oats Cereal Factory
- U.S. National Register of Historic Places
- Location within Ohio Location within the United States
- Location: 135 South Broadway Street, Akron, Ohio
- Coordinates: 41°4′52″N 81°30′54″W
- Area: 4 acres (2 ha)
- Built: 1886
- NRHP reference No.: 78002195
- Added to NRHP: December 8, 1978

Quaker Square was a shopping and dining complex located in downtown Akron, Ohio which was later used by the University of Akron. Quaker Square was the original Quaker Oats factory; the complex consists of the former mill, factory, and silos. The buildings were bought in the early 1970s by developers who sought to create a unique, useful home for shops and restaurants. The buildings were bought by the University of Akron in 2007. The hotel has been converted to a residence hall. The retail space consisted of dozens of small shops and restaurants, and there were large areas of historic exhibits on such areas as the local Quaker industry and history of radio in Akron, while offices were on the floors above. Quaker Square was open to the general public until September 18, 2015. After that, the hotel no longer accepted reservations as the former hotel rooms and the entire complex began to be operated exclusively for student and university use. The university fully vacated the facility by 2022 and ultimately sold it in 2025. As of 2026 it was being converted into a retail complex again.

== History ==
The Quaker Oats company was formed by the merger of several businesses, one was the Akron-based German Mills American Oatmeal Company founded by Ferdinand Schumacher. Schumacher's facility, first built in 1872, was destroyed by fire in 1886, then was rebuilt at the same location. Those buildings formed the basis of the Quaker Oats Cereal Factory. The complex consisted of cereal production facilities, warehouses, and rail-siding sheds. Quaker Oats built 36 grain silos on the site in 1932. Each silo was 120 feet tall and 24 feet in diameter, and together they housed 1,500,000 US bushels (53,000,000 L) of grain.

The complex is now the only remaining visual reminder of what was once Akron's largest single employer. Quaker Oats terminated production in Akron in 1970. The entire complex was listed in the National Register of Historic Places in 1972.

== Mall ==
The facility was repurposed in March 1973, and reopened April 1, 1975, with four shops and an ice cream parlor.

The silos were converted into a Hilton Hotel which opened in 1980. Later it became a Crowne Plaza hotel. The hotel was built into the suite of silos and is famed for its 196 completely round rooms. The facility also included a restaurant themed with railroads and the Quaker Square General Store, as well as other retail establishments.

The property contains many Don Drumm sculptures.

== Purchase by University of Akron ==
In mid-June 2007 the University of Akron bought the complex for $22,679,000 with plans to convert it into student housing and office space. The university planned to house more than 400 students in the converted hotel starting with the 2008 spring semester. In January 2008, the university began to use the upper floors of the hotel as a residence hall.

Under contract with UA, RDA Management of Fairlawn operated 95 hotel rooms on the four bottom floors of the silos for the following two years. The university agreed to keep those rooms available to the public for that period to give the city an opportunity to secure more hotel space for downtown visitors and tourists. On June 30, 2013, the hotel was closed and converted entirely into student housing. The last of the shops at Quaker Square, as well as Trackside, closed in 2016. The only remaining store was a Zee's store which is a convenience store for students to buy groceries and snacks. In August 2018, Zee's moved to the lobby of UA's Quaker Hall, leaving the retail portion empty. That side of the complex housed offices on the second, third, and fourth floors. After the 2018 spring semester, the dormitory was closed after it was discovered that the rooms had fallen into significant disrepair. At the onset of the COVID-19 pandemic in March 2020, the former dormitory was used to quarantine students that were unable to leave campus if infected. By the end of the pandemic in 2022, the remaining rooms were no longer used, leaving the facility empty.

== Sale to new ownership ==
The University of Akron announced on March 12, 2025, that they were selling the entire complex. In May 2025 a group of investors including former Akron mayor Don Plusquellic and internet celebrity and local construction manager Kyle Craven announced plans to renovate and reopen the complex. The group acquired the property in June 2025; the University of Akron's lease lapsed July 1, 2026.

== Gallery ==
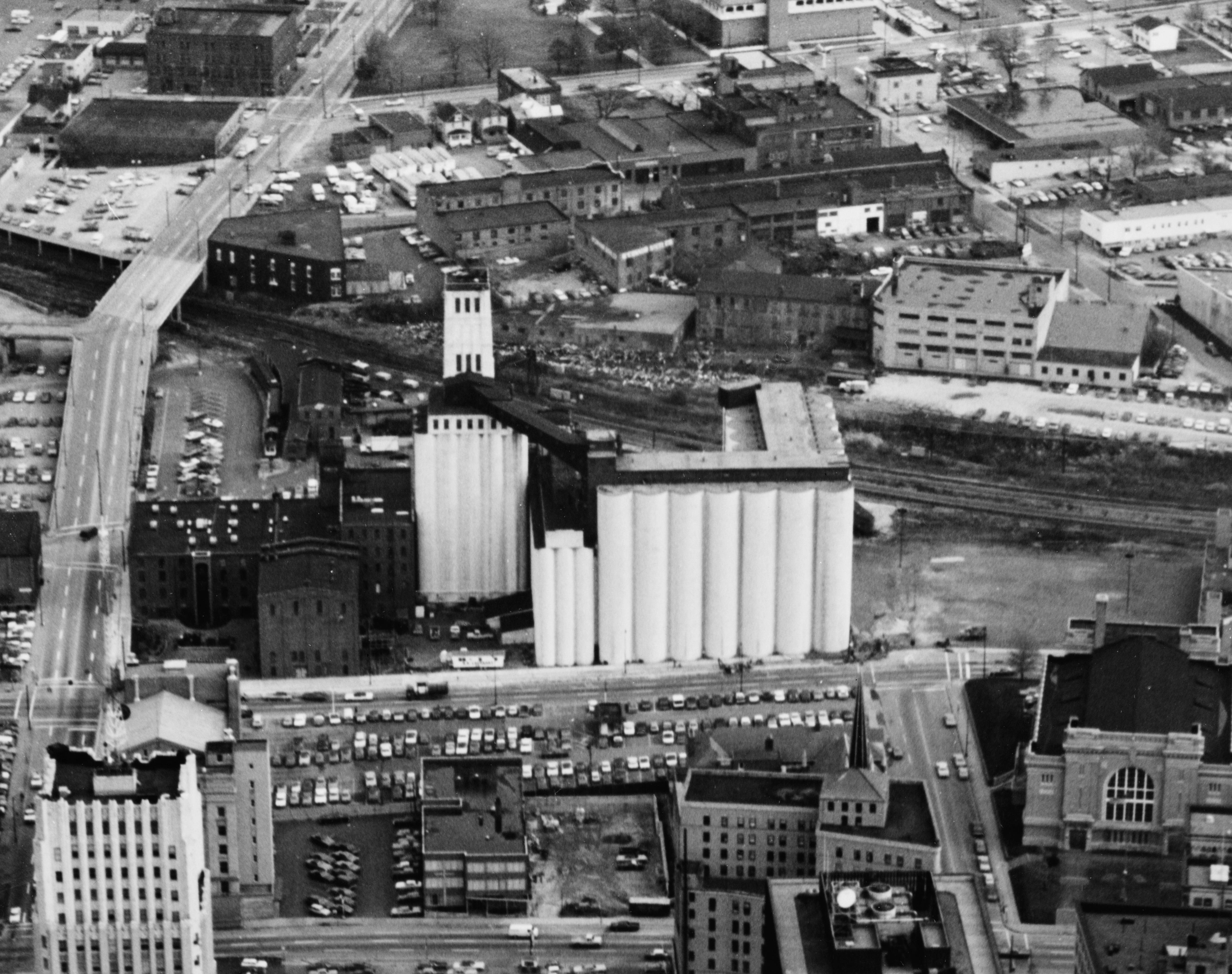
Quaker Square, 1979

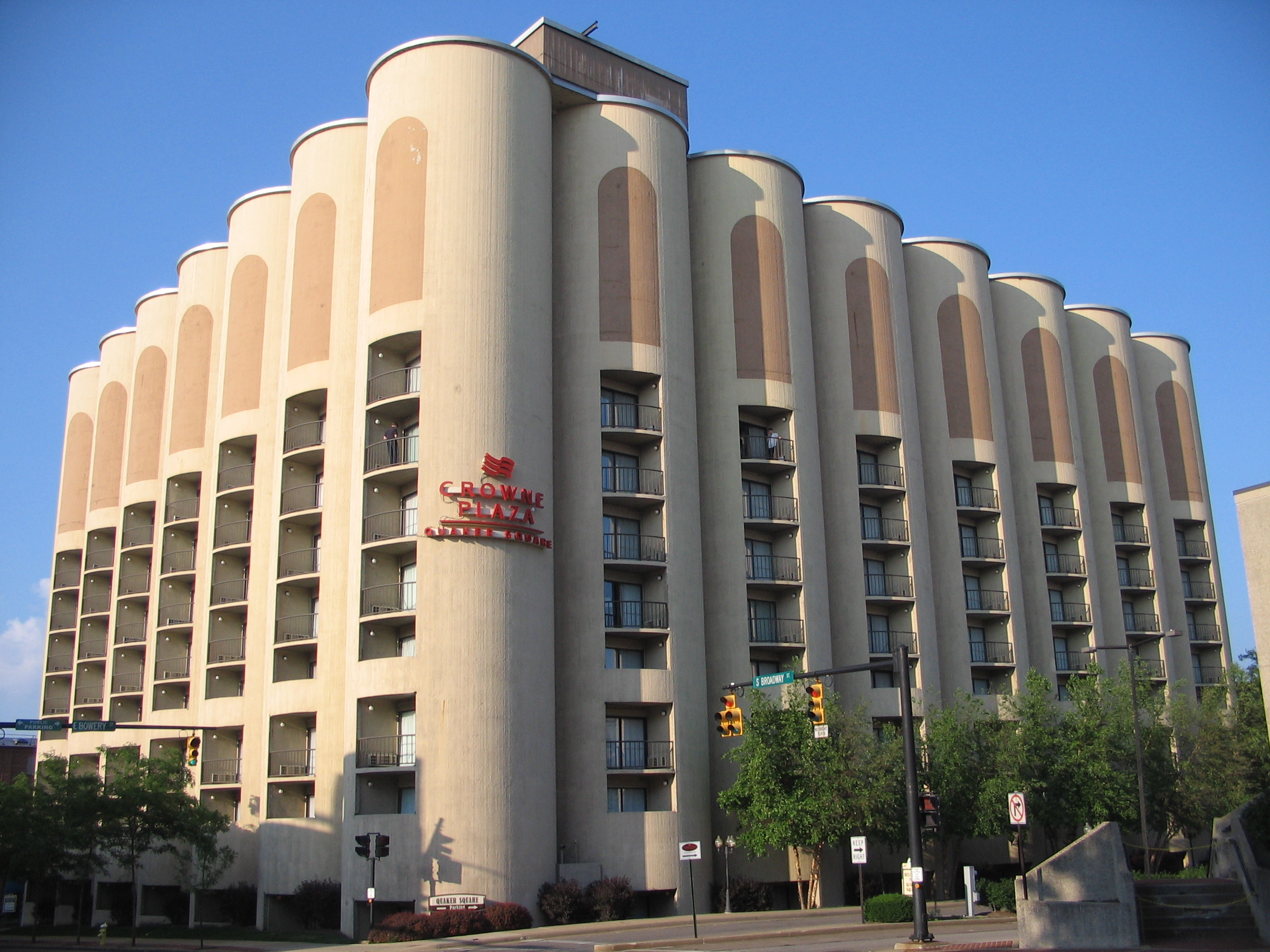
Quaker Square, 2007, when it was known as the Crowne Plaza Quaker Square hotel and Quaker Square Inn

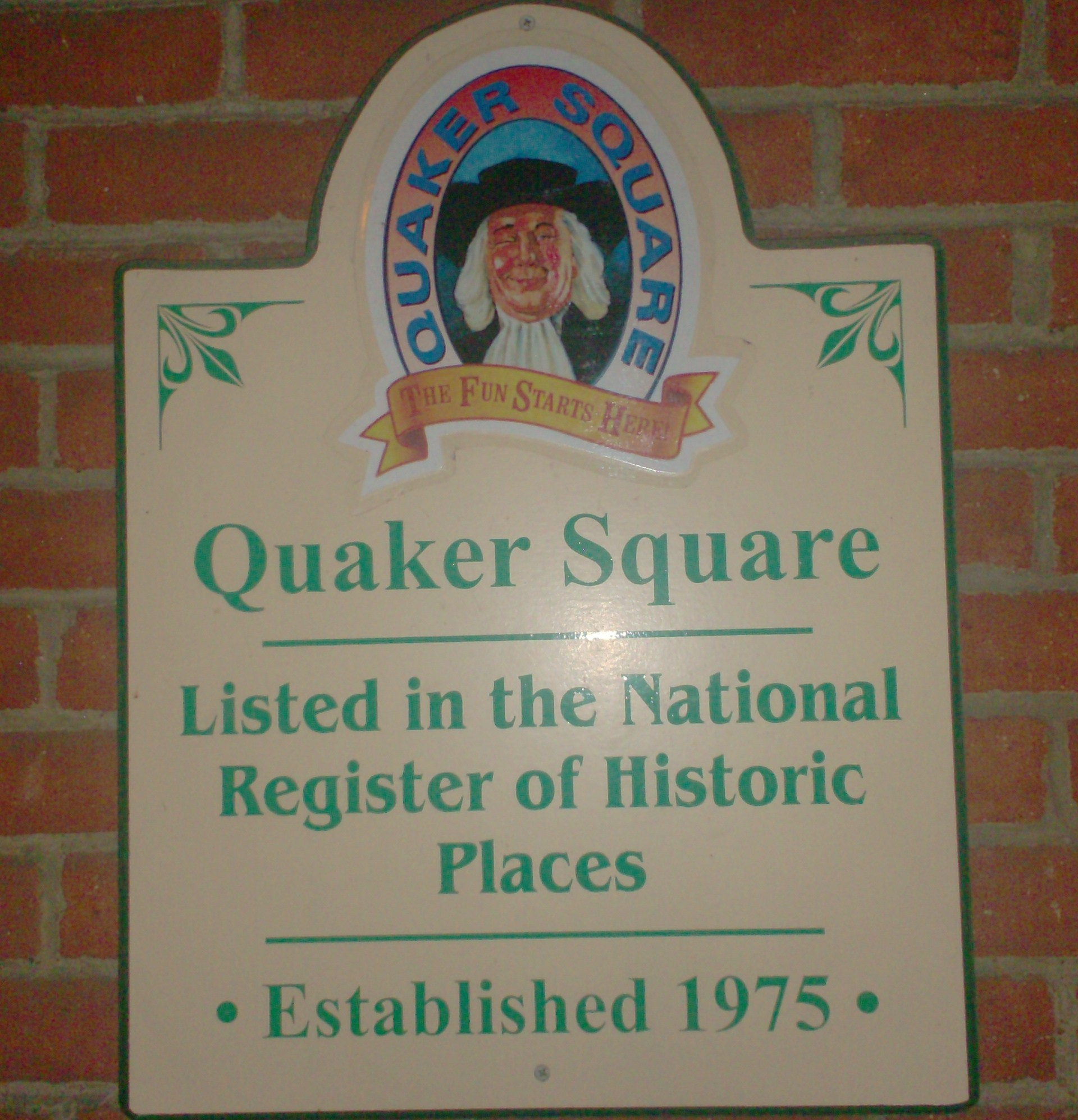
National Historic Place seal

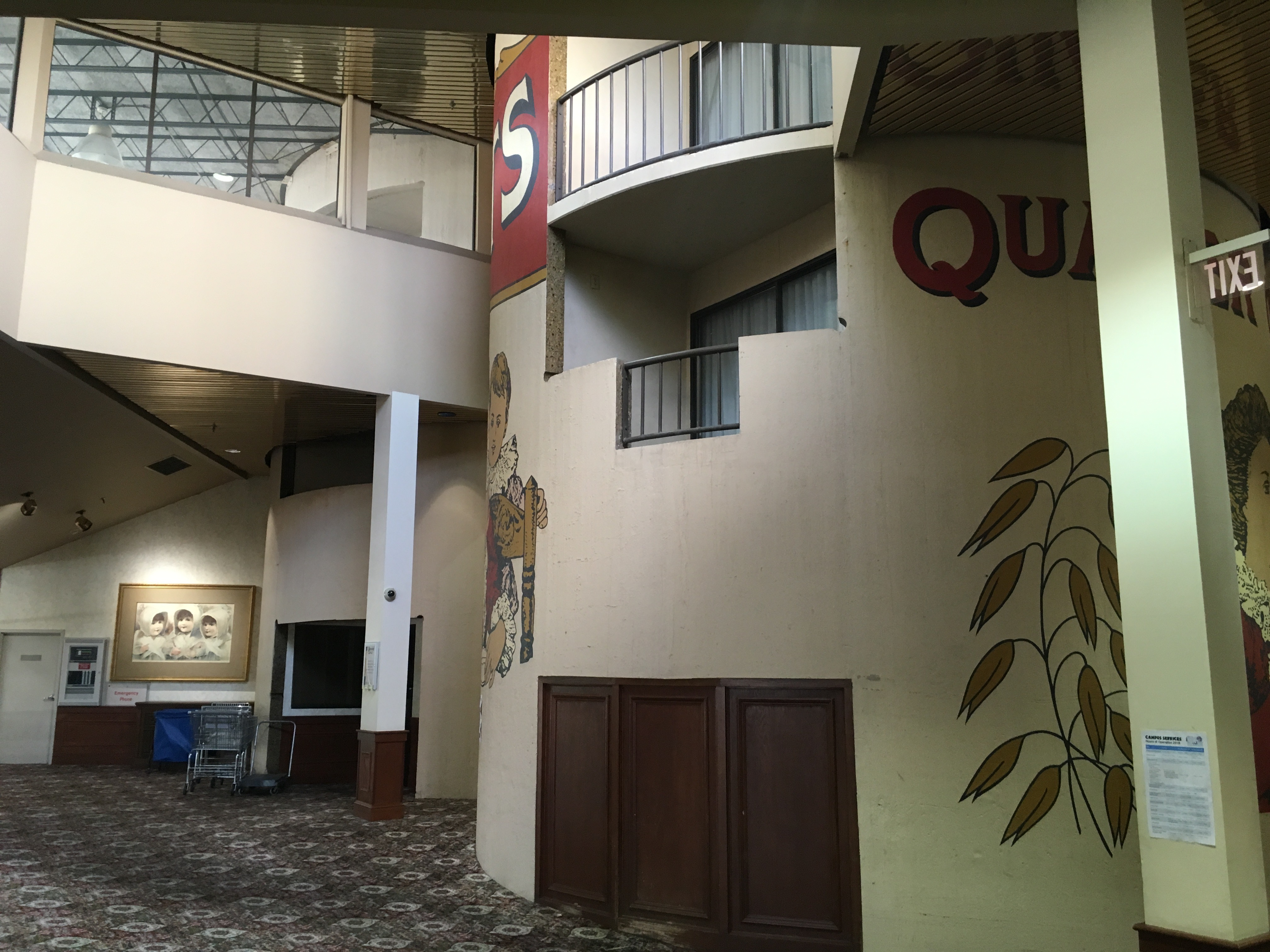

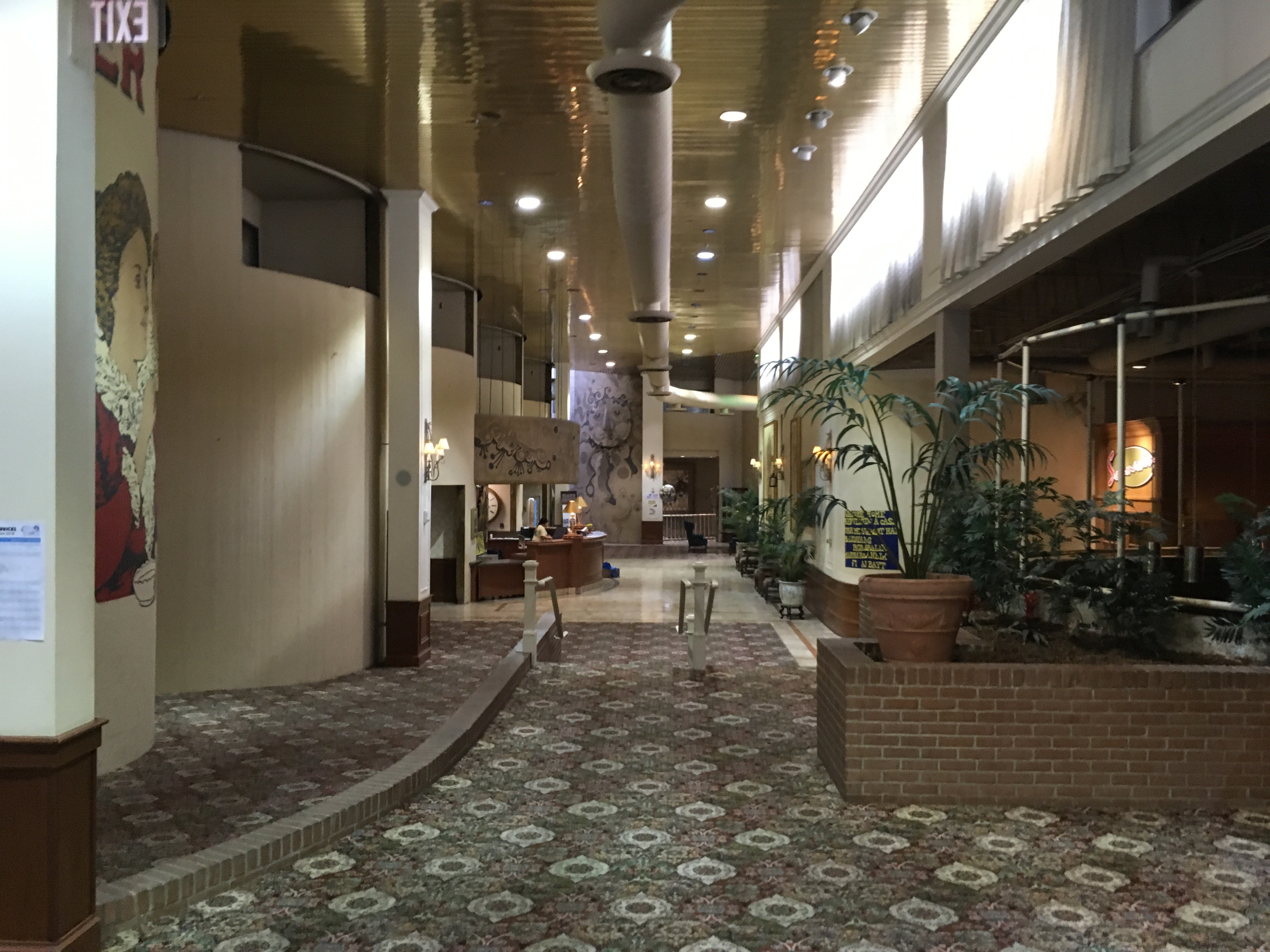

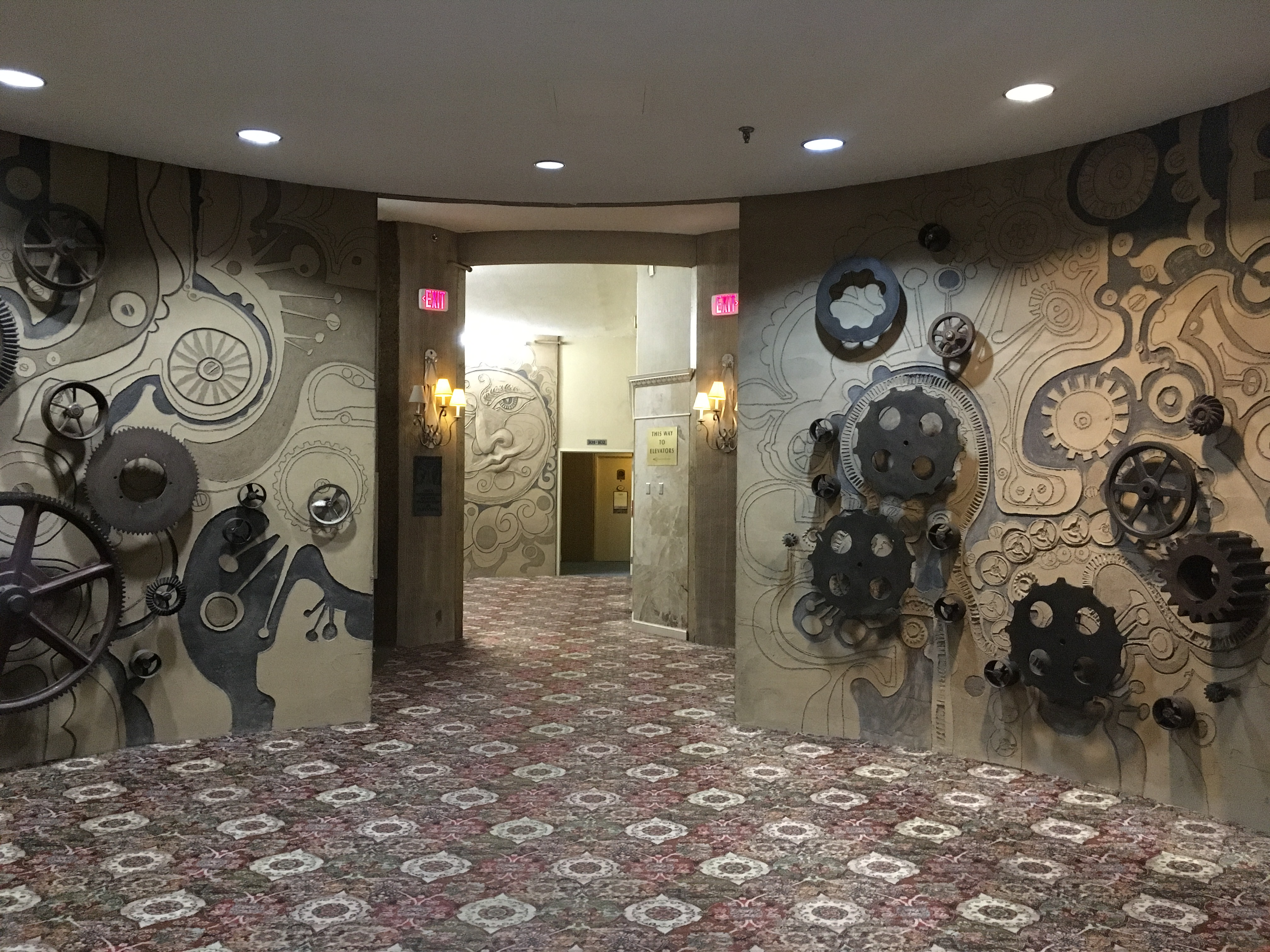

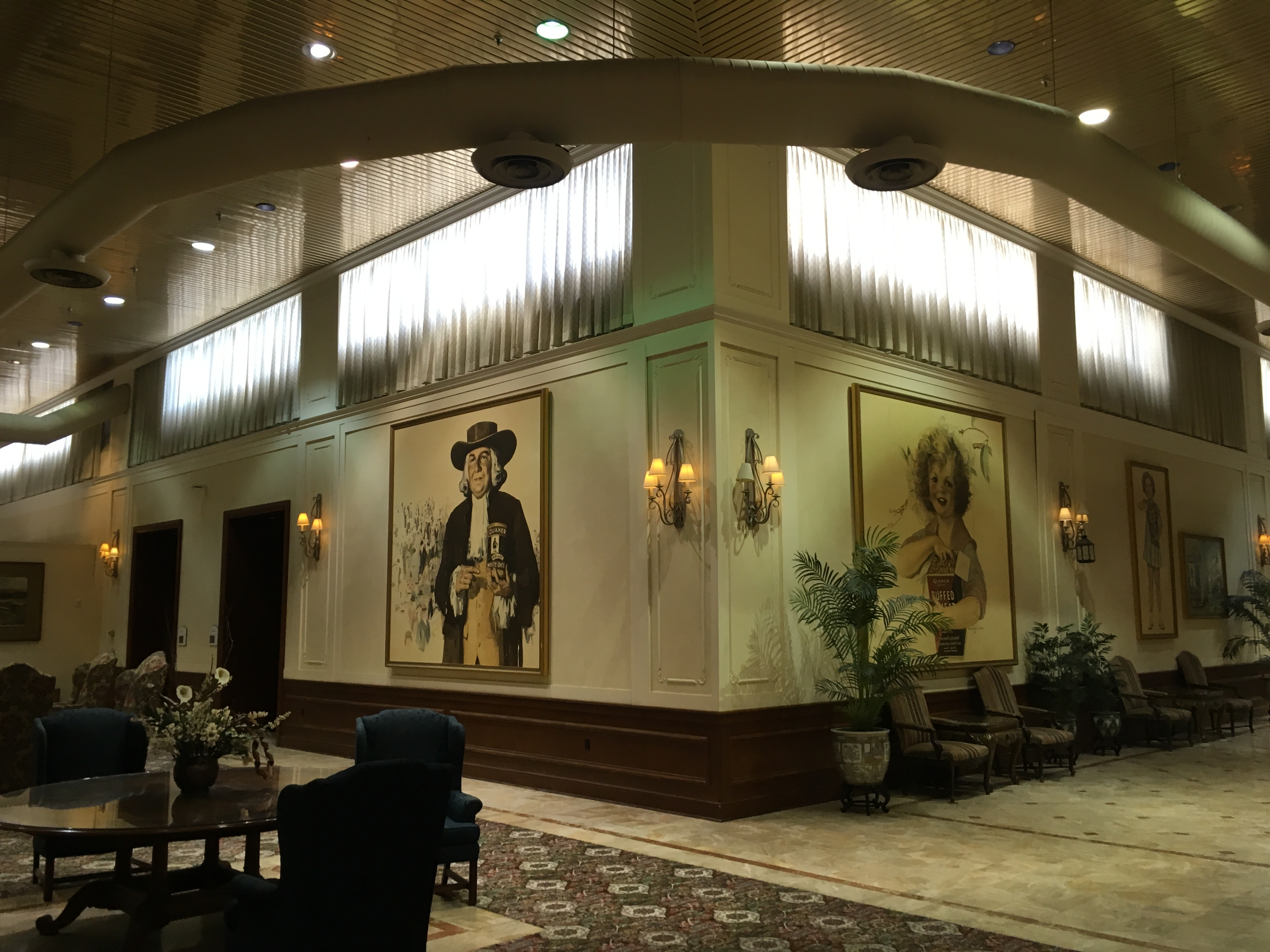

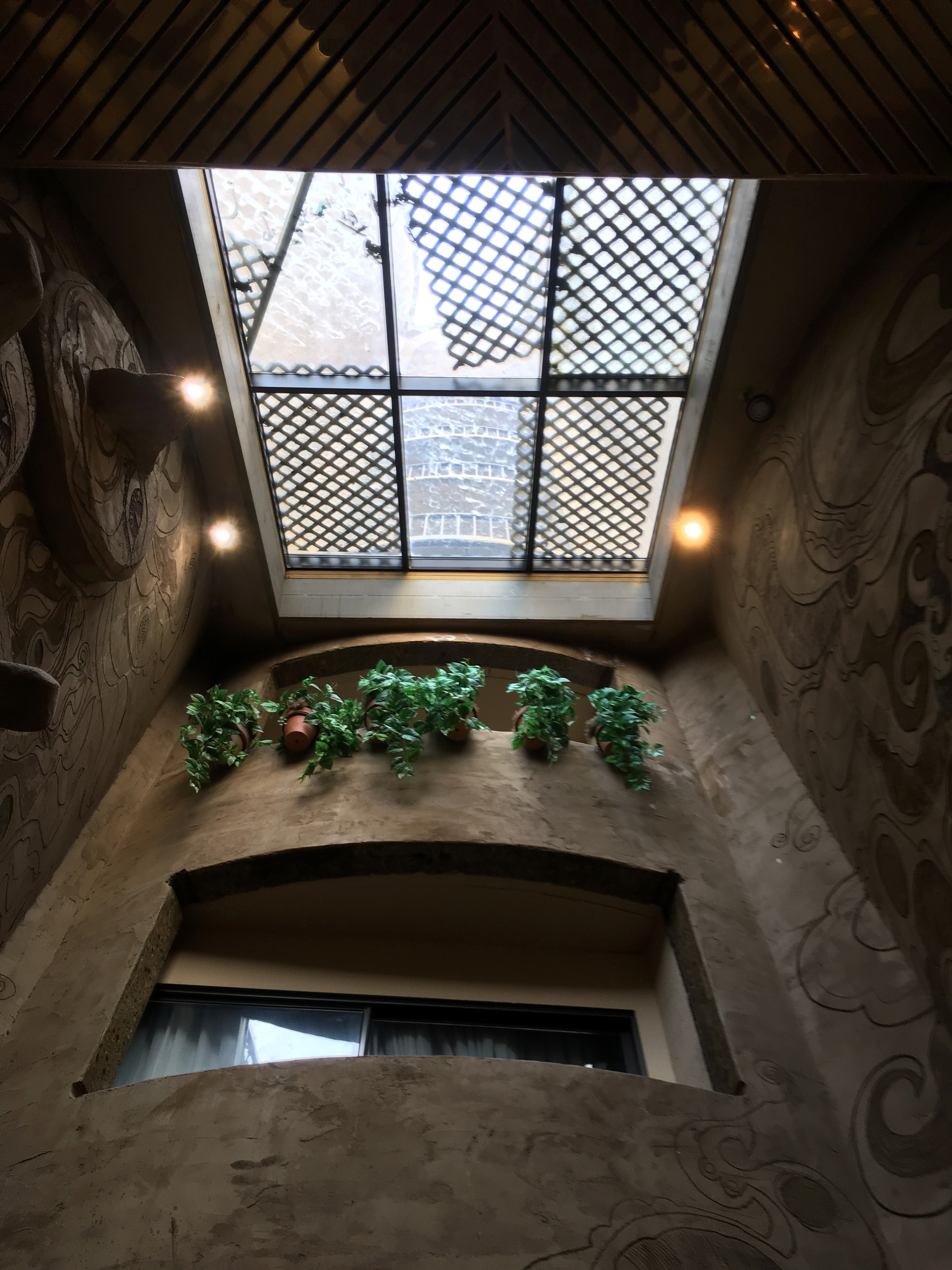

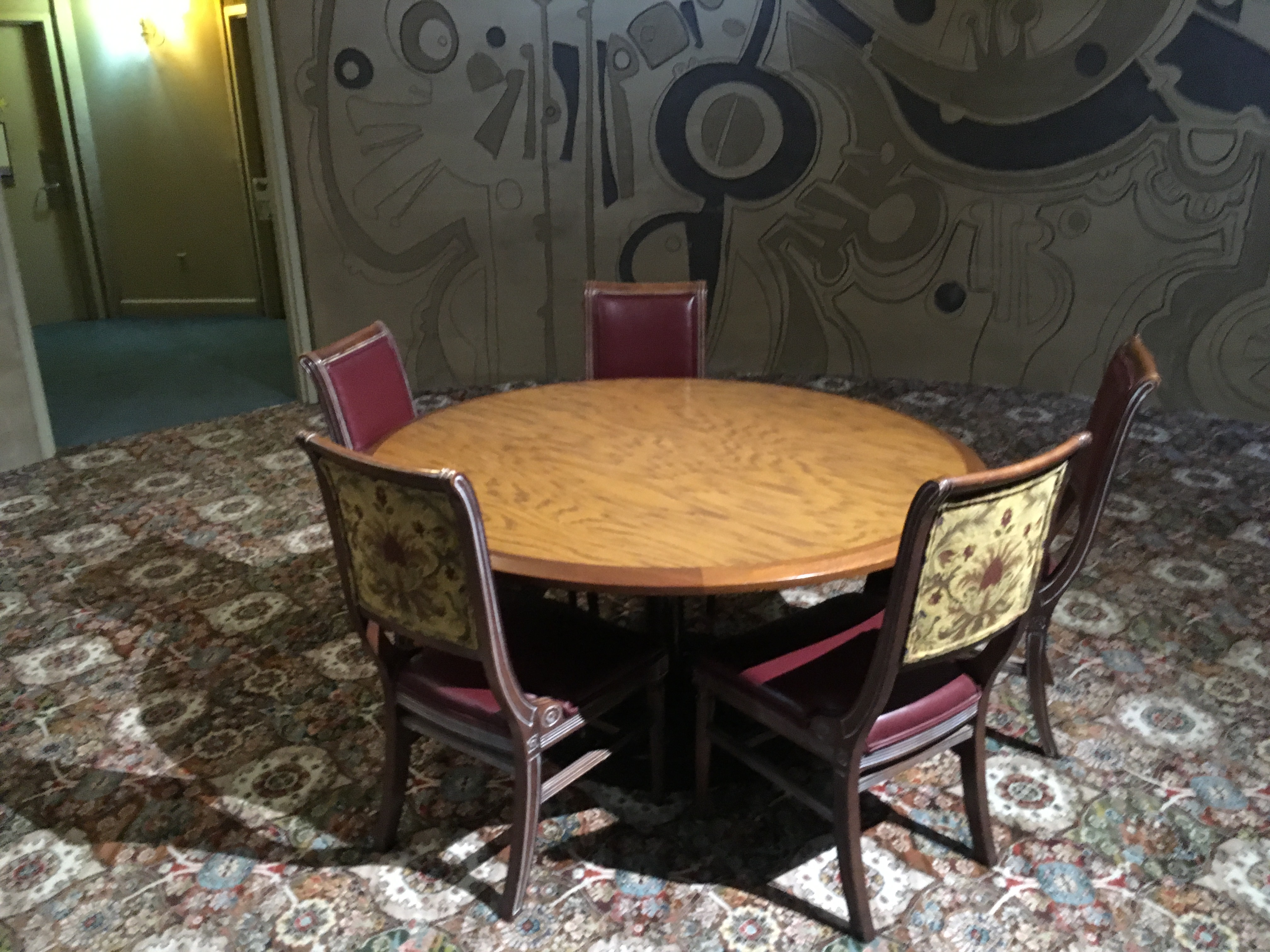

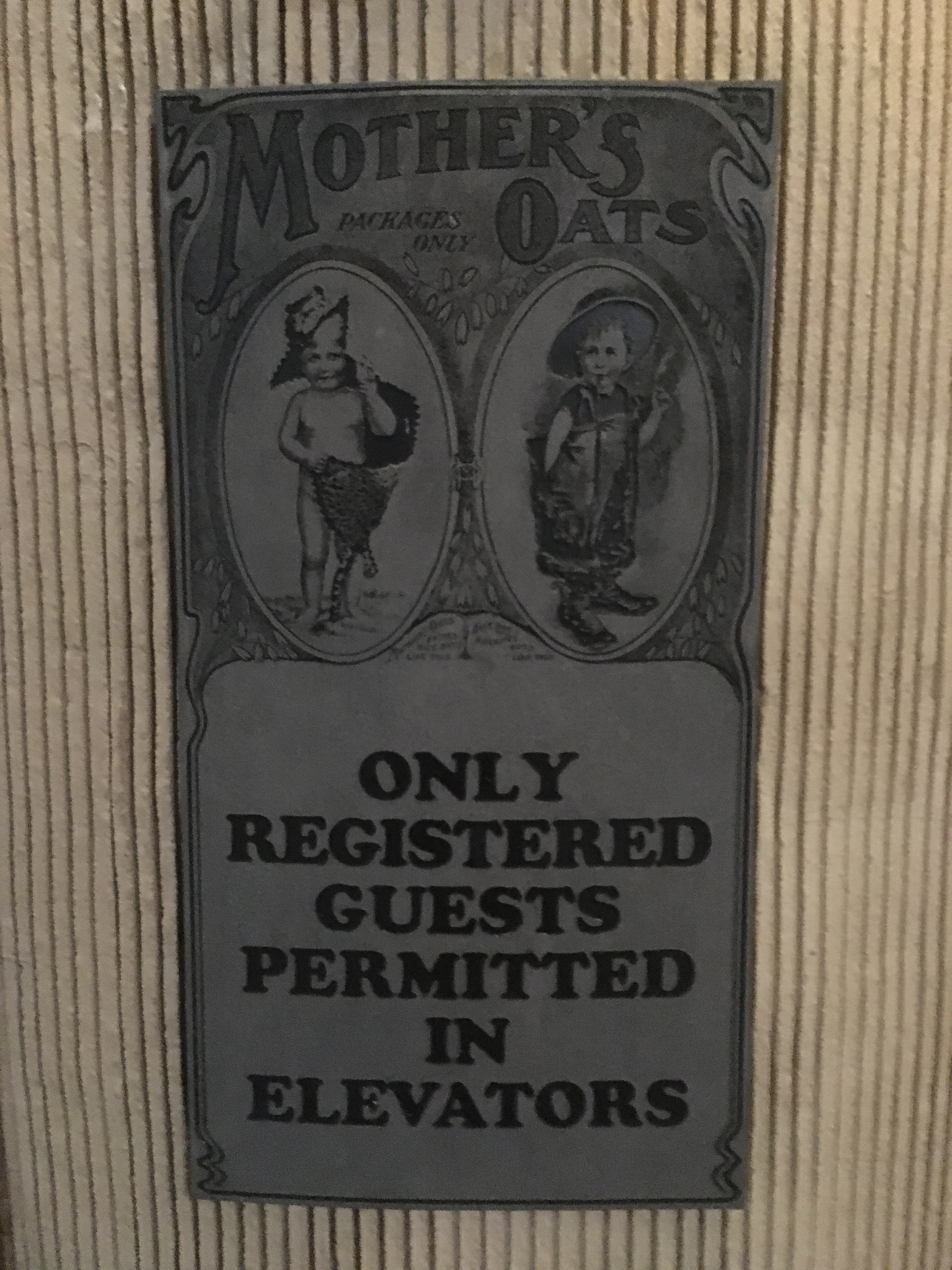

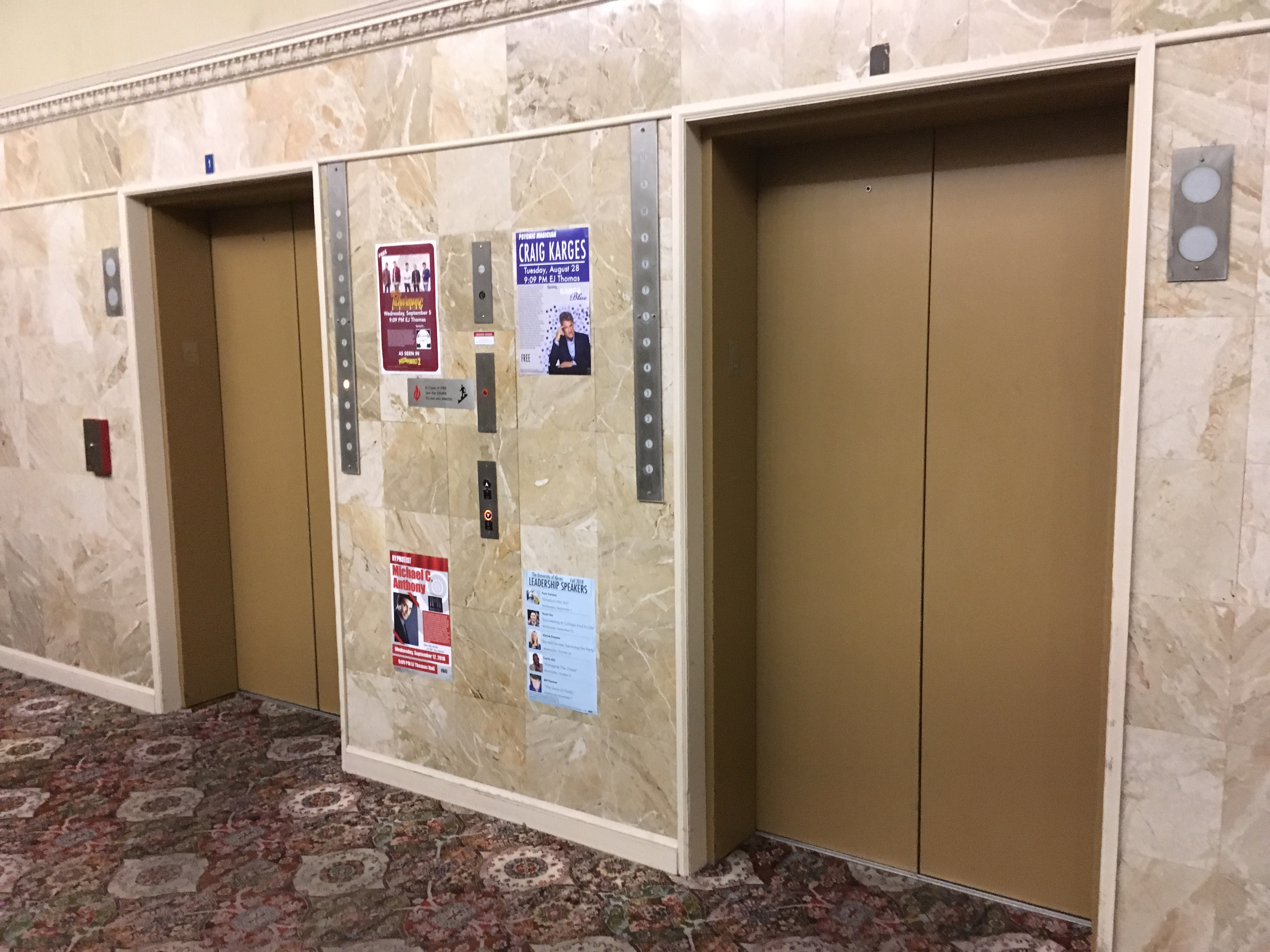

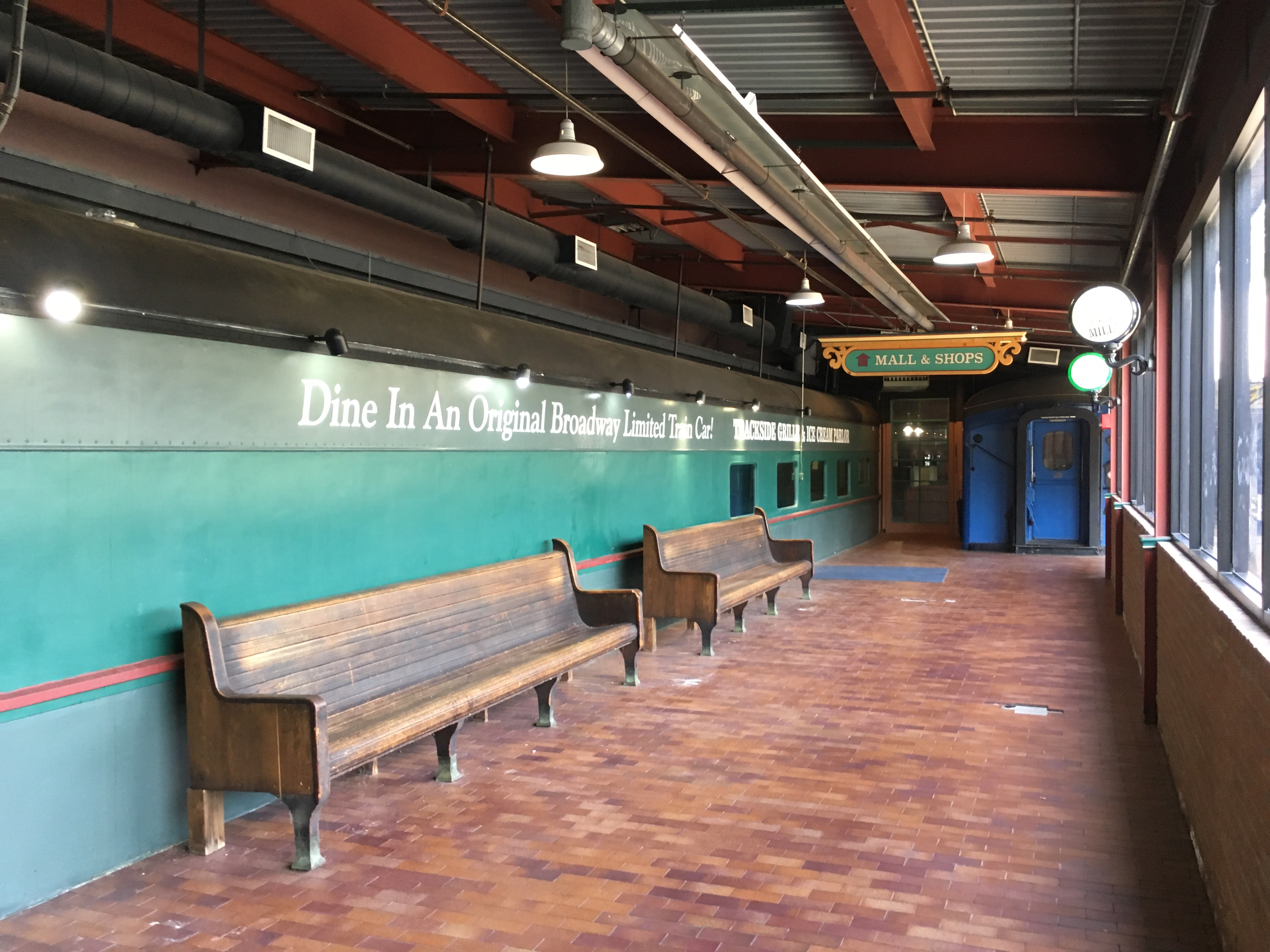

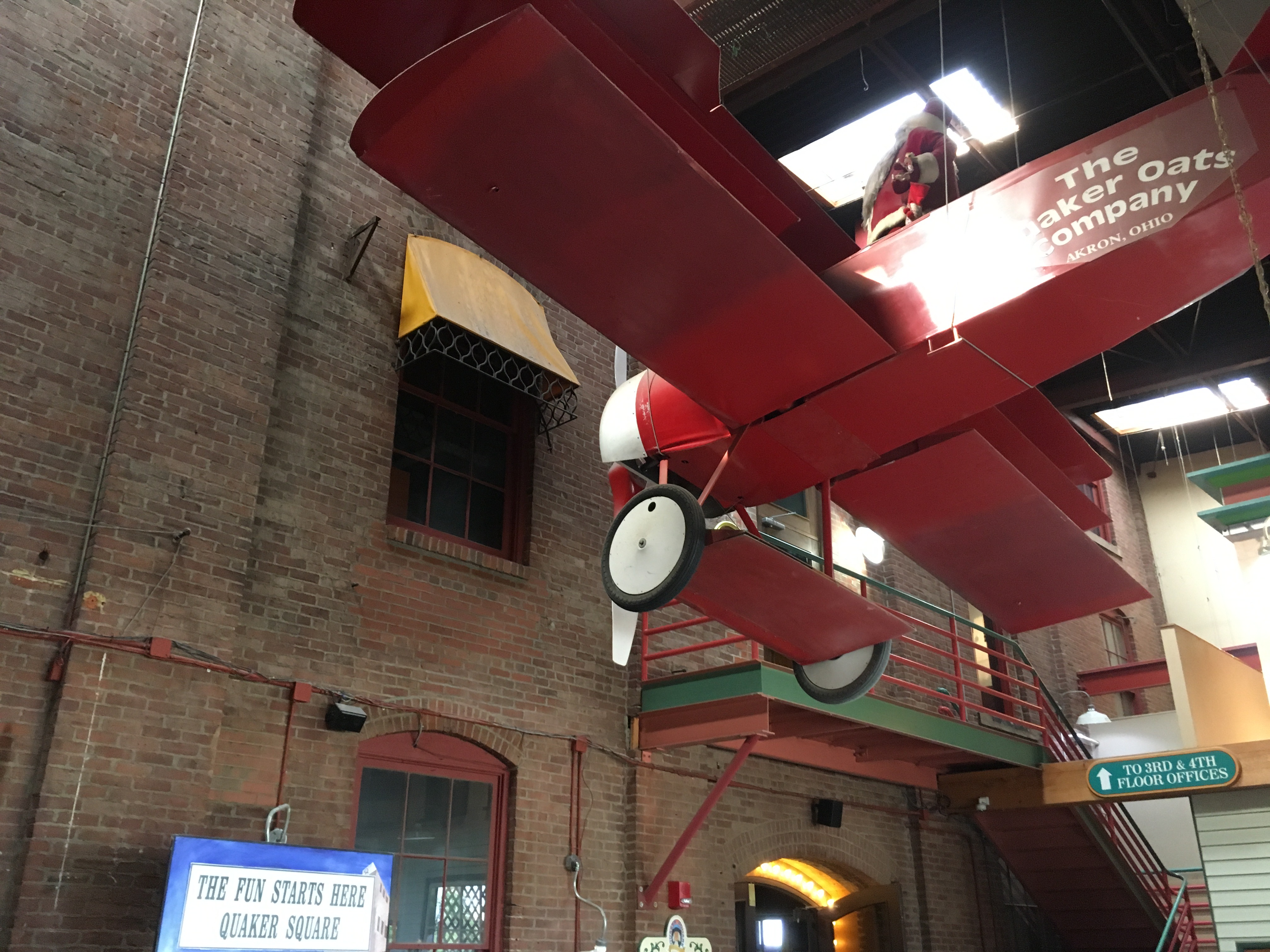

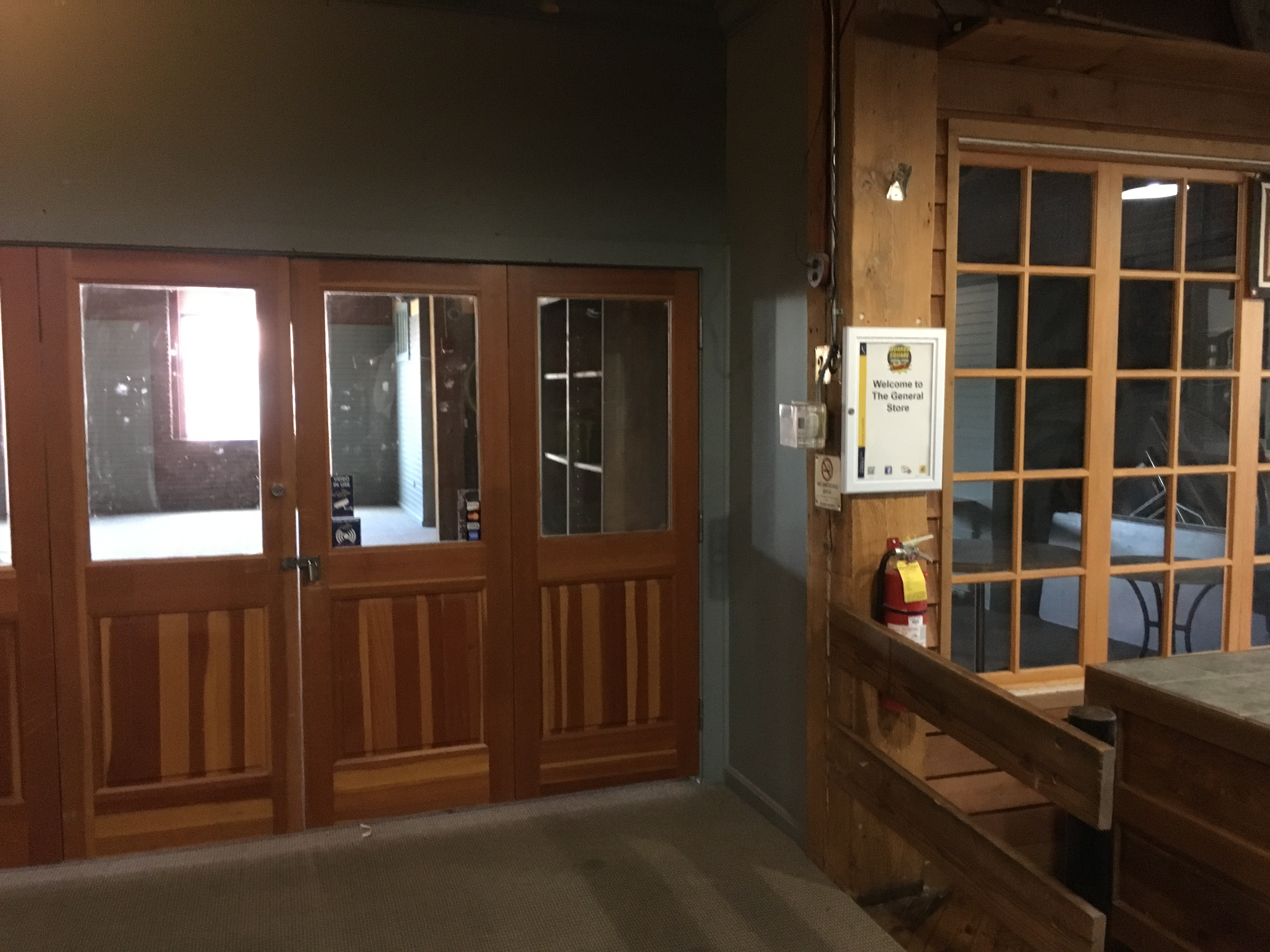

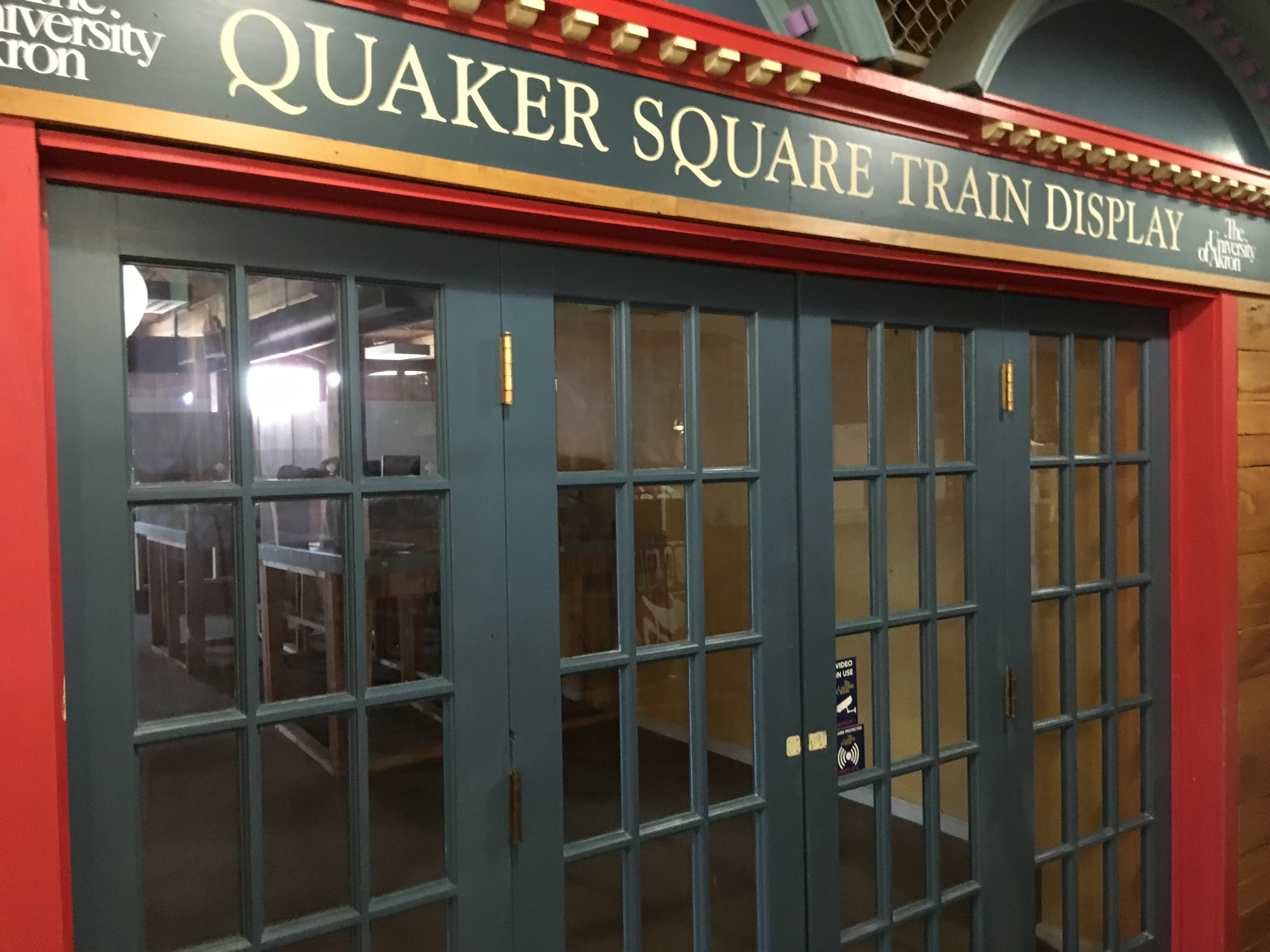

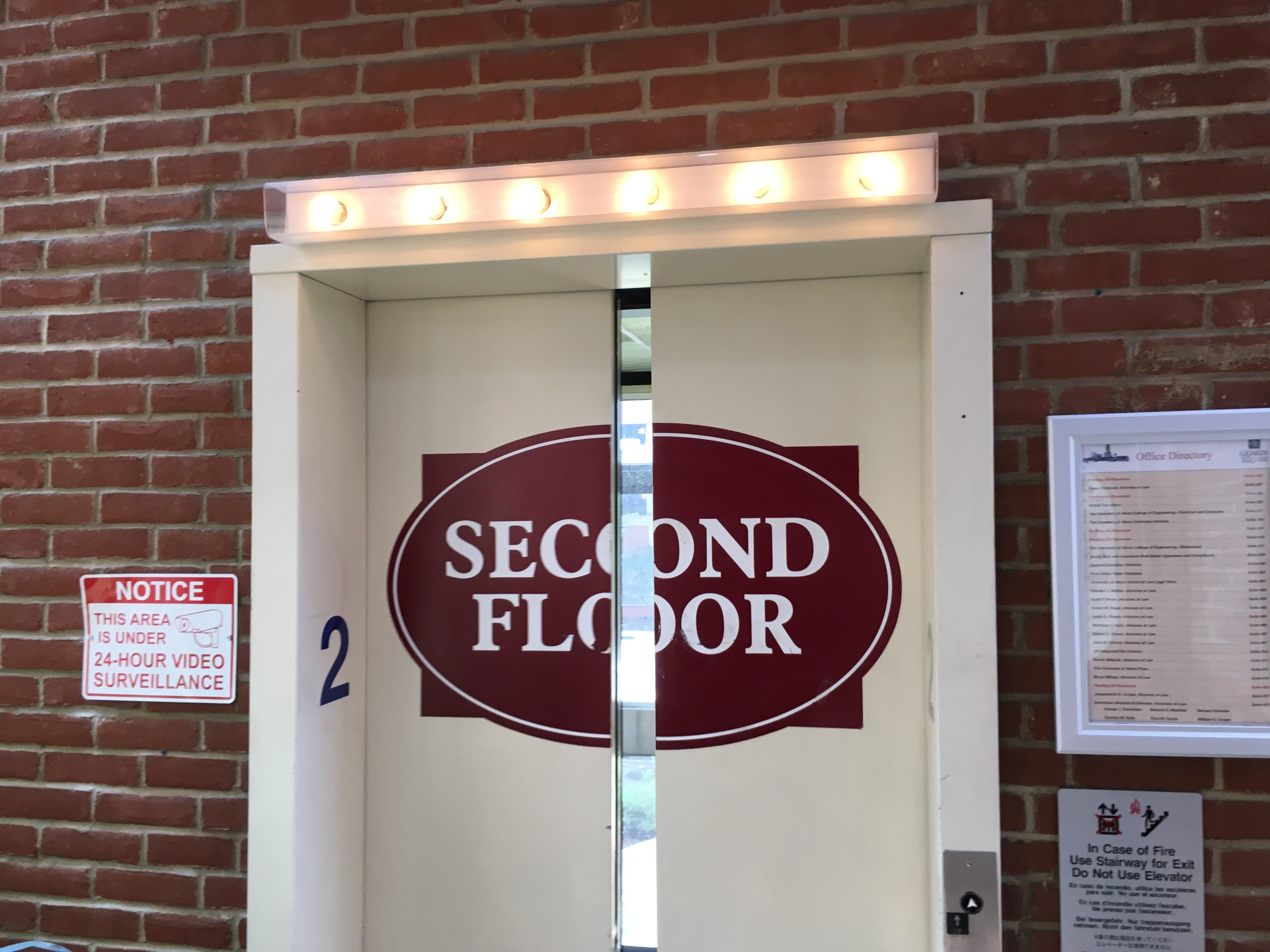

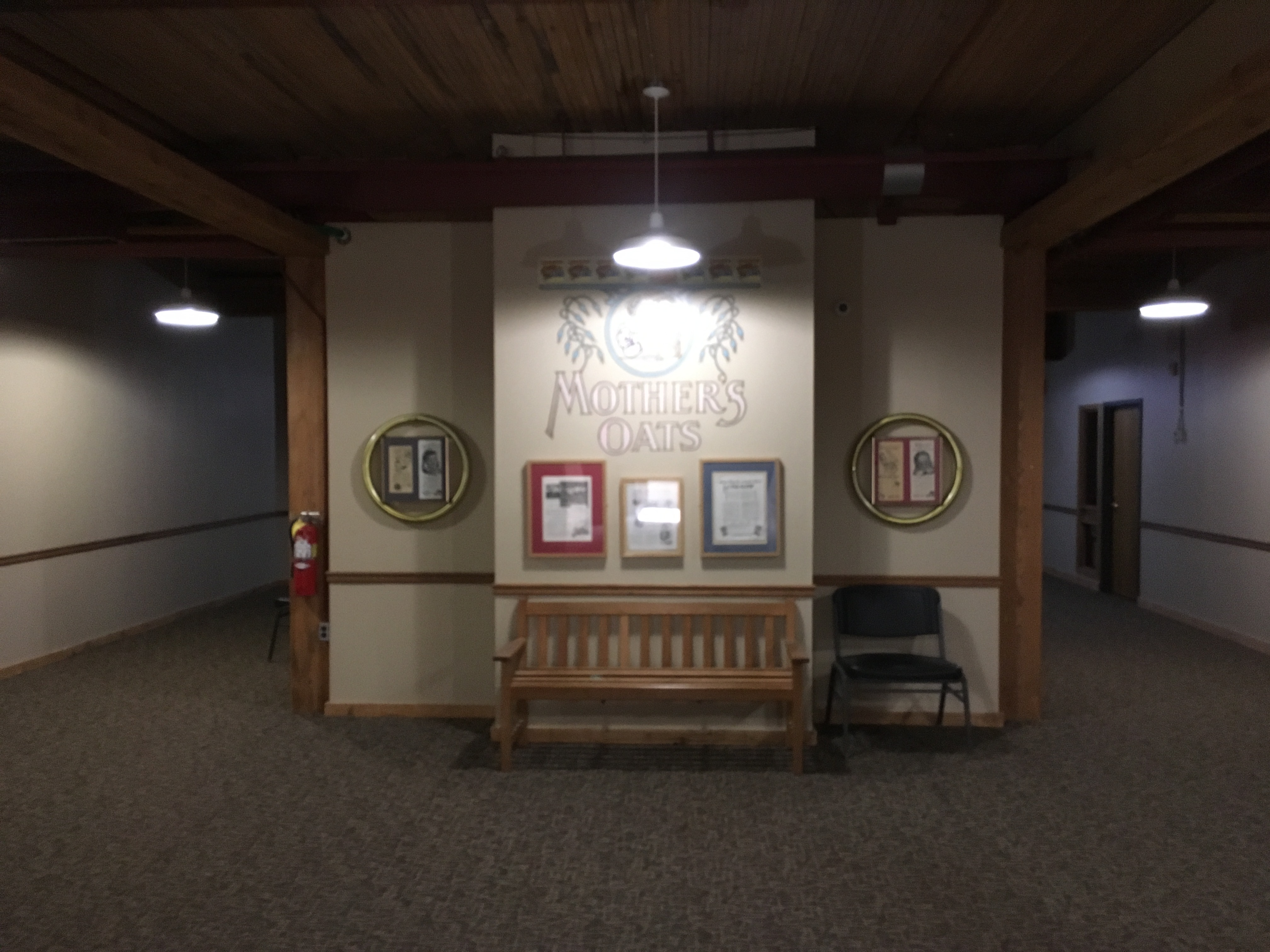

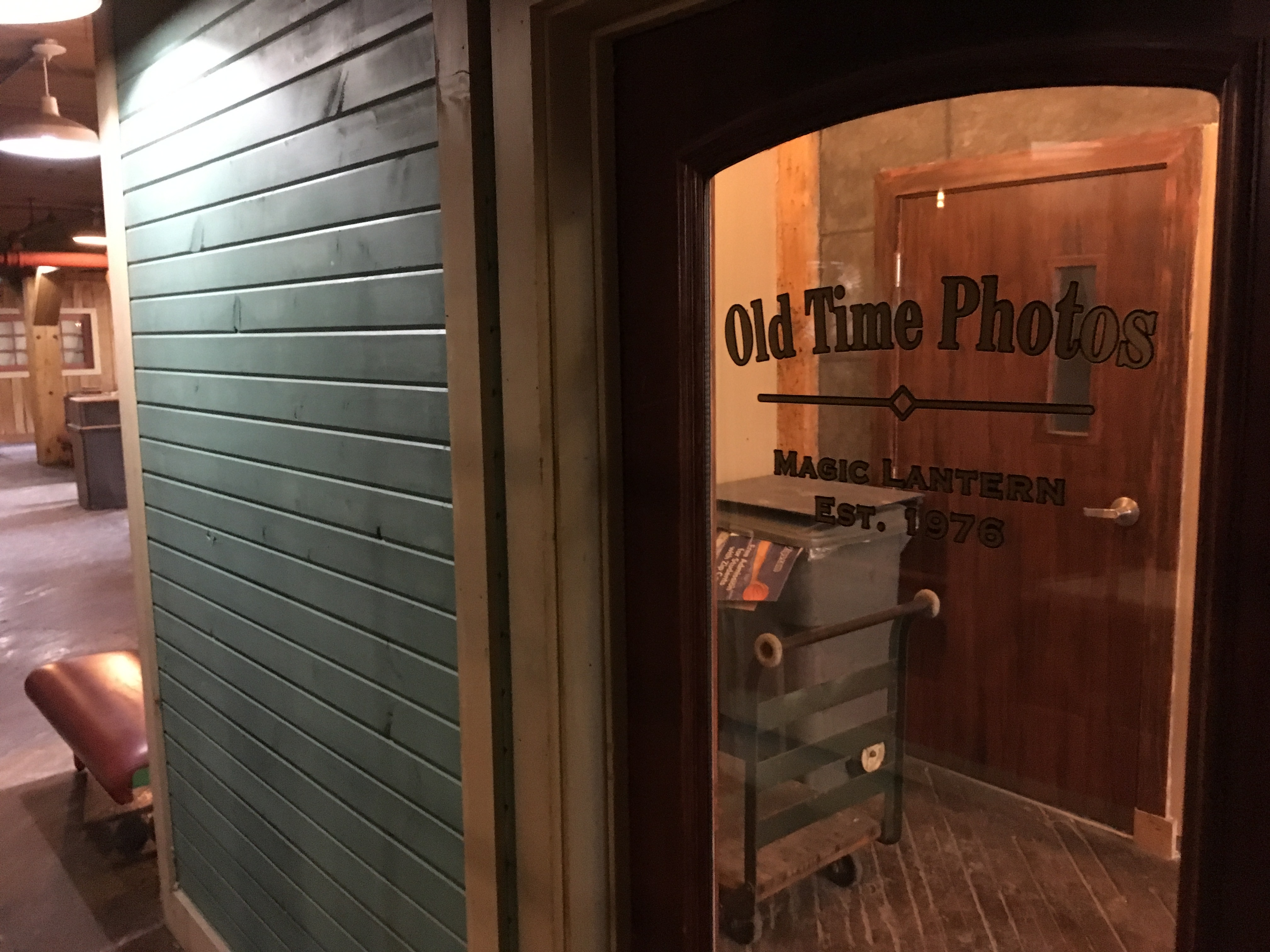

== See also ==
Akron station, former Amtrak station on and adjacent to the Quaker Square property
