= Overly Attached Girlfriend =

Internet meme

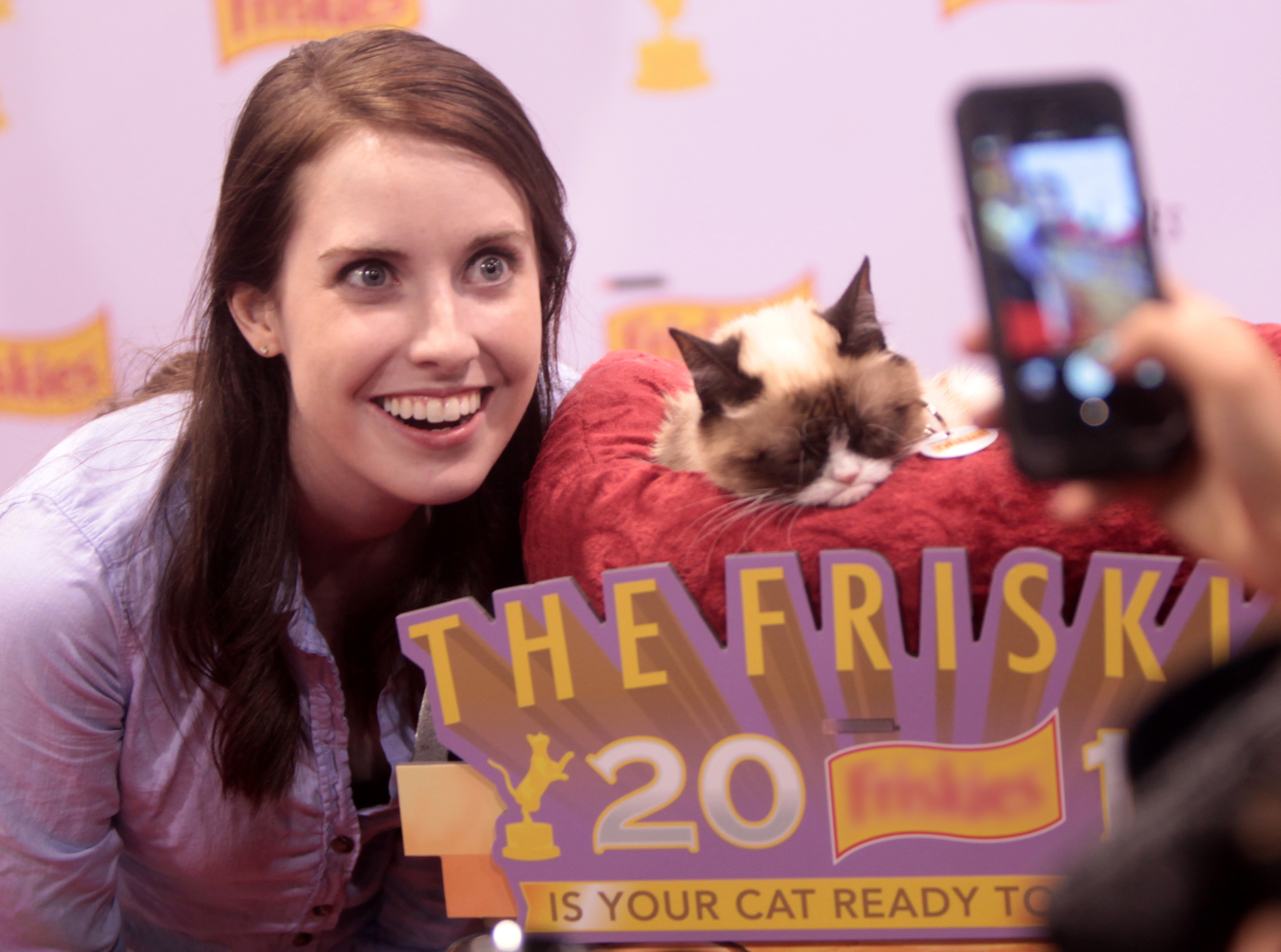
- Laina Morris, the "Overly Attached Girlfriend", posing with Grumpy Cat at the 2014 VidCon in Anaheim, California
- Created by: Laina Morris
- Portrayed by: Laina Morris

External videos
- Laina's original video that started the Overly Attached Girlfriend character

Overly Attached Girlfriend (OAG) is a fictional character and an Internet meme originating in a YouTube video published on June 6, 2012. The character was created by Laina Morris (born June 22, 1991). The video was a submission to a contest held by Justin Bieber who challenged fans to create a "Girlfriend" counterpart to his hit song "Boyfriend". The video, which satirized elements of the Bieber song that have been perceived as clingy, featured Morris staring at the camera with a fixed smile while singing about Facebook-stalking her boyfriend and other themes.

In 2019, Morris announced her departure from YouTube and posted a video on July 24, 2019, detailing that she is no longer going to make videos and is quitting YouTube altogether. She talked about the depression and anxiety that she experienced off camera. Prior to this announcement, she had only posted one video to YouTube in the previous two years. In April 2021, an image of the Overly Attached Girlfriend was sold as an NFT for $411,000.

== Popularity ==
As of December 2021, her YouTube channel has more than 1.25 million subscribers and more than 161 million views. Her username is still "wzr0713" officially, but her display name now identifies her as "Laina". Her video was noticed by the social news website reddit and quickly became popular, gaining more than 170,000 views the first day.

Arising from the success of the video, 'OAG' became an Internet meme that features the image macro of the young woman featured in the video, smiling and staring maniacally at the camera that has been captioned in a way that portrays her to be a stalker, jealous, or committed to her love interest to an unhealthy degree. The image still came from the video and was made into an image macro which also became very popular and spread across many social media websites and was remixed in various ways.

During 2021, the still macro image was converted into an NFT and sold by Morris.

== Overly Attached Girlfriend on YouTube ==
On June 18, 2012, another video, in which the Overly Attached Girlfriend sang a parody of Carly Rae Jepsen song "Call Me Maybe", also became very popular. Morris has also made videos of Drake's "The Motto", a lip-synced medley of "Every Breath You Take" by The Police, "As Long as You Love Me" by Backstreet Boys, "Girlfriend" by Avril Lavigne, "Your Love Is My Drug" by Ke$ha, "Just Got Started Lovin' You" by James Otto, and "You Belong with Me" by Taylor Swift. A parody of Taylor Swift's "We Are Never Ever Getting Back Together" was uploaded on December 17, 2012. A parody of "What Makes You Beautiful" by One Direction uploaded on January 14, 2013, was done not as OAG. "Snapchat," a parody of "Blurred Lines," was uploaded on July 4, 2013. Morris has also been featured in videos by Shane Dawson, Tyler Oakley and TheBrothersReidell among others, and has been featured in a Teens React by TheFineBros. She continued to bring out new videos every Thursday, often using her signature "smile". On June 6, 2013, she uploaded a video featuring a montage of clips from her past uploads, reactions by viewers, and television appearances, to celebrate the first anniversary of the original OAG video.

On June 13, 2013, she uploaded her first political video, a parody of the U.S. national anthem in which she is dressed as Uncle Sam and sings about watching you through Skype, Facebook, and Google because she "cares" but does not mention the current NSA leaking controversy specifically.

On May 20, 2015, Delta Air Lines posted a safety video that included OAG and other Internet memes.

On July 25, 2019, Morris uploaded a video announcing her retirement from YouTube. Morris has cited multiple reasons for the announcement, including depression, stress and mental health.

On June 6, 2022, Morris uploaded a video celebrating the 10th anniversary of the meme while thanking her fans for support. She appears both in and out of character in the clip.

== Identity of Overly Attached Girlfriend ==
The user behind the meme is Laina Morris from Denton, Texas, and has been named by Mashable as one of "15 People Made Famous by the Internet in 2012". She identifies herself in videos only as Laina with many articles leaving out her last name on her request. Morris has tried to add to the "Overly Attached" image by showcasing a gentler, more playful side. This has involved a new "attachment" to her Kia Soul, comedy skits on "LifeAccordingToJimmy", reporting from the red carpet at the American Music Awards, videos starring her dogs Luna and Gilly, and "Dare to Share" for charity.

She did revisit the character but with a twist, playing an "Overly Attached Computer" on November 12, 2012, in a commercial published by Samsung displaying its 840 SSD. The reaction was mixed with some labeling her a sell-out and others applauding the move to creating a career from her "meme". On September 25, 2013, Morris appeared with Good Girl Gina, Sheltered College Freshman, and Bad Luck Brian in a "Meme Hunters" commercial for RealPlayer Cloud.

Despite the "Overly Attached Girlfriend" being portrayed as a crazed hopeless romantic, Morris confirmed on a viewer fan mail episode on January 22, 2015, that she was in a relationship at that time.

== Appearances ==
On March 11, 2013, Morris appeared on Late Night with Jimmy Fallon. In May 2013, Morris won a staring contest with Jessica Alba at the Singapore Social Awards, presented by Starcount. In December 2013, she was a guest on The Nerdist podcast with Chris Hardwick. She appeared with the Epic Meal Time team in the 2013 YouTube Rewind. She also appeared on TableTop playing Cards Against Humanity.

In October 2026, Morris appeared as Overly Attached Girlfriend in Mozilla's Come Back to Firefox advertising campaign, alongside several other viral internet personalities from the 2000s and 2010s. The campaign used nostalgia for early internet culture to promote Firefox, with the character's obsessive behavior serving as a humorous reference to online tracking and data privacy.
