= Paul T. Mikolashek =

United States Army lieutenant general

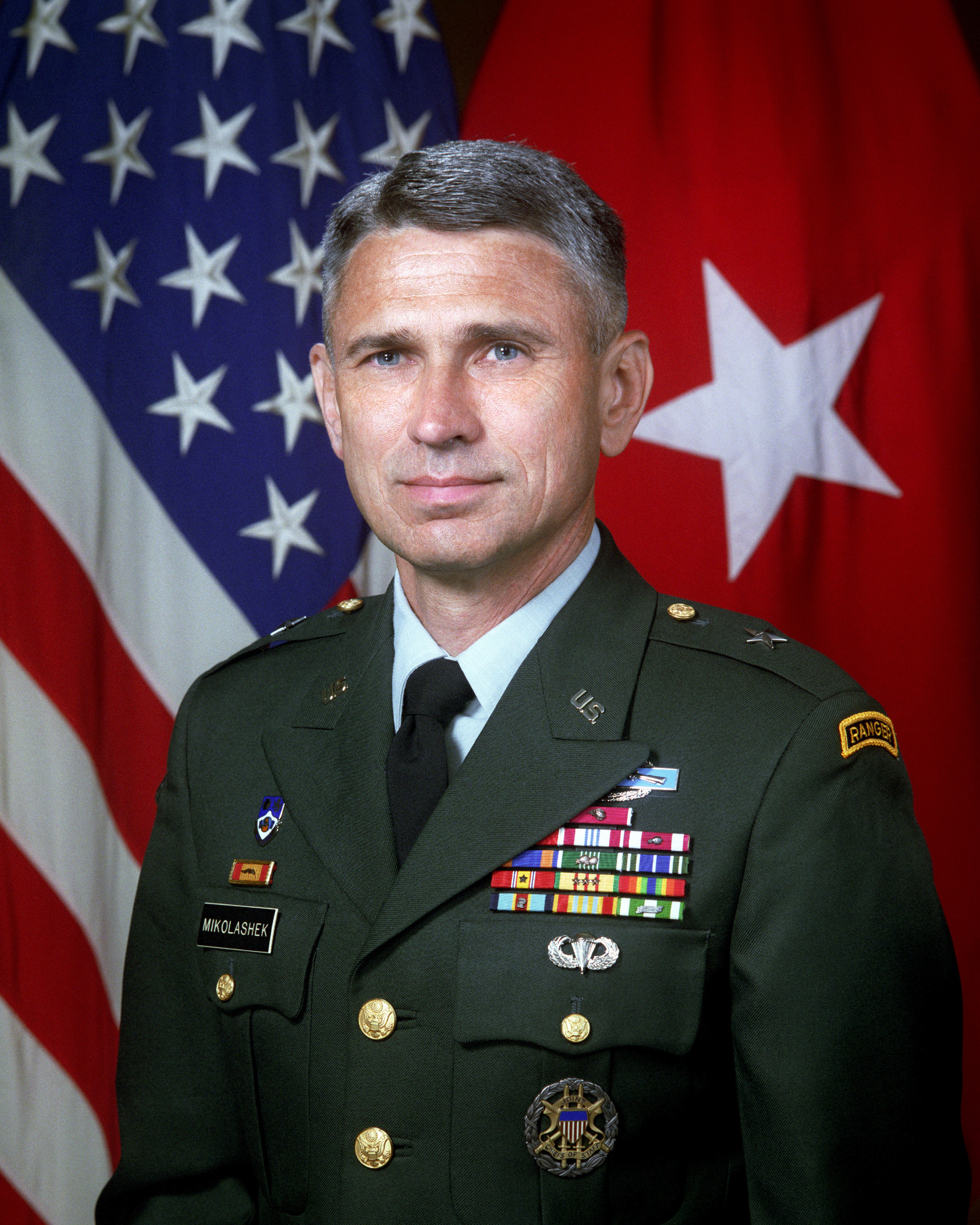
- Mikolashek as a brigadier general in 1994
- Born: November 24, 1947 (age 78); Akron, Ohio, U.S.
- Alma mater: University of Akron; Michigan State University; Armed Forces Staff College; United States Army War College
- Spouse: Janis Lee Pittinger (m. 1969)
- Military career
- Service: United States Army
- Service years: 1969–2005
- Rank: Lieutenant General
- Nickname: P. T.
- Unit: United States Army Infantry Branch
- Commands: Headquarters and Headquarters Company, 2nd Battalion, 327th Infantry; 2nd Battalion, 23rd Infantry; Office of Military Cooperation, Kuwait; 3rd Training Brigade; U.S. Army Southern European Task Force (Airborne); United States Army Central; Inspector General of the United States Army
- Wars: Vietnam War
- Awards: Defense Superior Service Medal; Legion of Merit (2); Bronze Star Medal (2)
- Other work: Corporate executive International business consultant

Paul T. Mikolashek (born November 24, 1947) is a retired United States Army officer. A veteran of the Vietnam War, he served from 1969 to 2005 and was Inspector General of the United States Army from 2002 to 2005. Mikolashek attained the rank of lieutenant general, and his awards and decorations included the Defense Superior Service Medal, Legion of Merit (2), Bronze Star Medal (2), Defense Meritorious Service Medal, Master Parachutist Badge, Combat Infantryman Badge, Ranger tab, Joint Chiefs of Staff Identification Badge, and Army Staff Identification Badge.

== Early life ==
Paul Thomas Mikolashek was born in Akron, Ohio, on November 24, 1947, a son of Ferdinand P. Mikolashek and Helen (Schmida) Mikolashek. He grew up in the Kenmore neighborhood of Akron and graduated from Archbishop Hoban High School in 1965. He received a Bachelor of Arts degree in history from the University of Akron in 1969. While in college, Mikolashek participated in the Reserve Officers' Training Corps program, and was a Distinguished Military Graduate. After graduating he received his commission as a second lieutenant of Infantry. In September 1969, Mikolashek married Janis Lee Pittinger of Akron.

== Civilian and military education ==
Mikolashek's military education included the United States Army Airborne School, Ranger School, the Infantry Officer Basic Course, and the Infantry Officer Advanced Course. His advanced professional education included the Armed Forces Staff College and United States Army War College. In 1982, Mikolashek received a Master of Arts degree in education administration from Michigan State University.

== Career ==
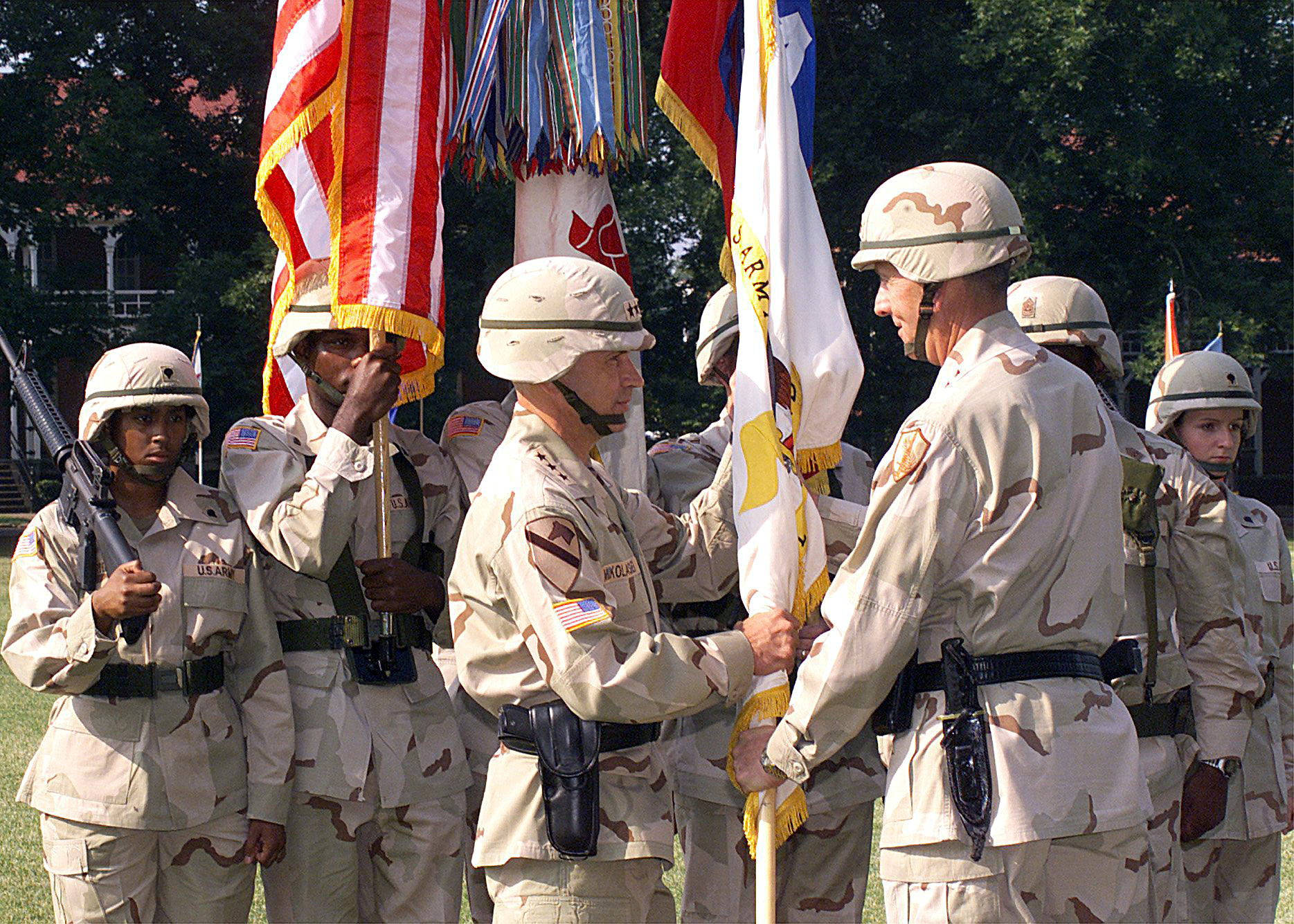
Mikolashek (left) receives the U.S. Army Central (ARCENT) colors from U.S. Central Command commander Tommy Franks in July 2000. Mikolashek succeeded Franks as ARCENT commander.

After completing his initial training, Mikolashek's first assignment was in West Germany as a platoon leader and assistant operations and training officer (Assistant S3) with the 1st Armored Division. He is a master parachutist and during his career Mikolashek completed over 70 jumps. He served as commander of Headquarters and Headquarters Company, 327th Infantry, before assignment to 1st Battalion, 12th Cavalry Regiment during the Vietnam War. Mikolashek later served with Military Assistance Command, Vietnam Team 73, and his Vietnam experience included defense of a fire base north of Biên Hòa and combat missions in the Mekong Delta.

Mikolashek's subsequent assignments included: secretary of the general staff for U.S. Army Japan and IX Corps; aide-de-camp, U.S. Military Representative, NATO Military Committee; commander, 2nd Battalion, 23rd Infantry; chief, Office of Military Cooperation, Kuwait; 3rd Training Brigade, Fort Leonard Wood, Missouri; chief of staff, 24th Infantry Division; assistant division commander, 82nd Airborne Division; and commander, U.S. Army Southern European Task Force (Airborne). At the start of Operation Enduring Freedom, Mikolashek commanded United States Army Central in Kuwait, where he was responsible for controlling ground force operations in Afghanistan.

== U.S. Army Inspector General ==
From 2002 to 2005, Mikolashek served as the 61st Inspector General of the United States Army. During his term, Mikolashek investigated the Abu Ghraib torture and prisoner abuse and similar incidents alleged to have occurred during the war on terror. In 2004, he released a report indicating that misdeeds had resulted from poor organization and training and outdated policies, but that these concerns had not directly contributed to the abuses. Mikolashek's report was the subject of controversy because his conclusions differed from those reached in an earlier inquiry by Major General Antonio Taguba, whose more critical report had been leaked to the news media before publication.

== Later career ==
After retiring from the army, Mikolashek became a corporate executive with Raytheon Technologies, serving as vice president and president of several divisions and subsidiaries until leaving the company in 2014. Following his career at Raytheon, Mikolashek was employed as an international business consultant for NSI Inc., with his work focused on issues and opportunities in the Middle East.

== Awards and decorations ==
Mikolashek's major military awards and decorations included:

- Defense Superior Service Medal
- Legion of Merit with oak leaf cluster
- Bronze Star Medal with oak leaf cluster
- Defense Meritorious Service Medal
- Meritorious Service Medal with silver oak leaf cluster
- Air Medal
- Army Commendation Medal with two silver oak leaf clusters
- Army Achievement Medal
- Master Parachutist Badge
- Combat Infantryman Badge
- Ranger tab
- Joint Chiefs of Staff Identification Badge
- Army Staff Identification Badge

In addition to his military awards, Mikolashek received the honorary degree of Doctor of Humane Letters from the University of Akron.
