= Archbishop Hoban High School =

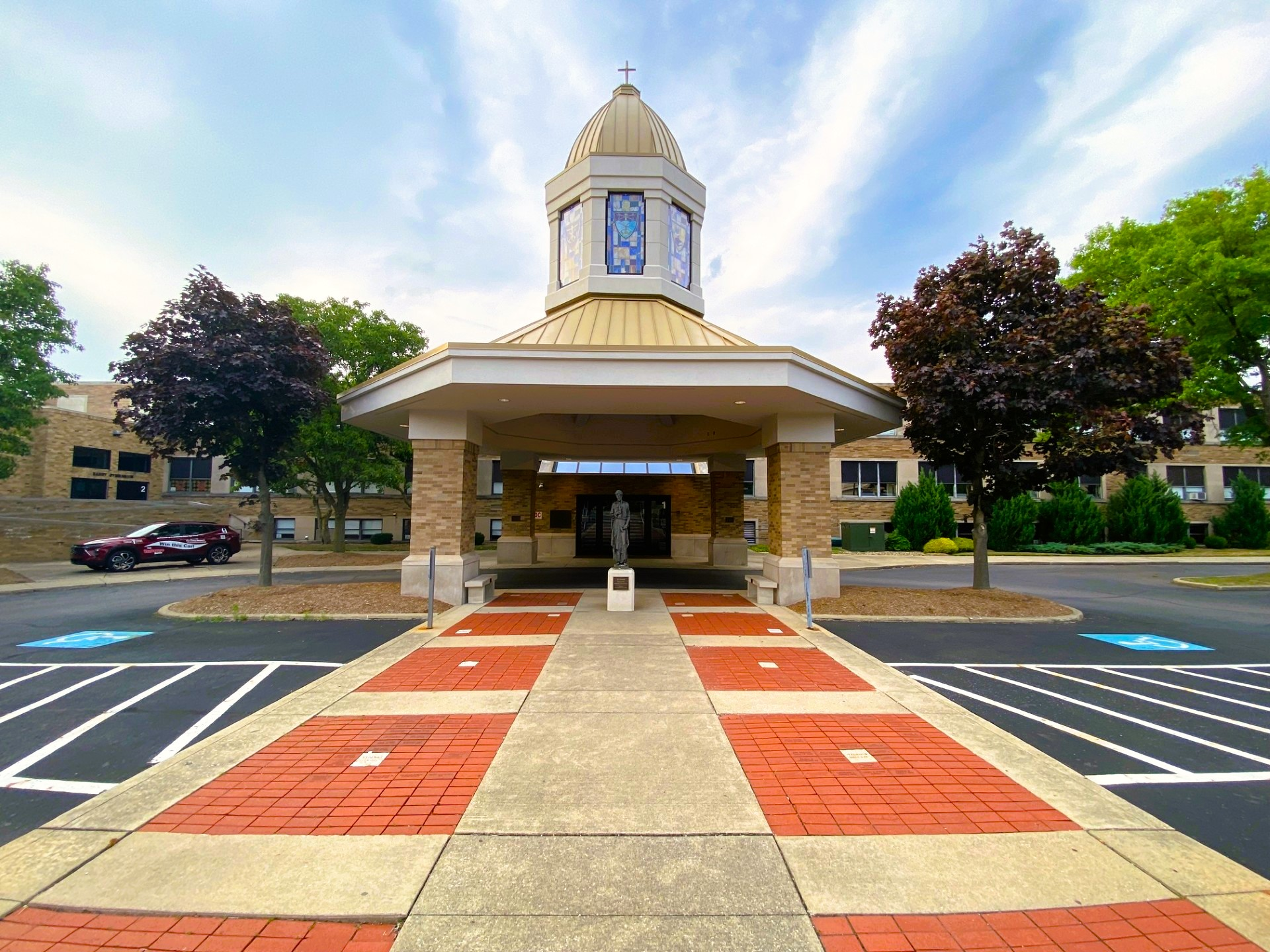

Location
- One Holy Cross Boulevard; Akron, Ohio 44306; United States; 41°3′45″N 81°29′44″W

Information
- Type: Private, College preparatory
- Religious affiliation: Roman Catholic
- Established: 1953
- Oversight: Brothers of Holy Cross
- NCES School ID: 01058774
- President: Chris DiMauro
- Principal: T.K. Griffith
- Faculty: 53.6
- Grades: 9–12
- Enrollment: 841 (2023–24)
- Student to teacher ratio: 15.7
- Colors: Navy and Vegas gold
- Athletics conference: North Coast League
- Team name: Knights
- Newspaper: The Visor
- Website: www.hoban.org

Archbishop Hoban High School is a Catholic college-preparatory school in Akron, Ohio. It is sponsored by the Catholic religious order Brothers of Holy Cross.

== History ==
In the early 1950s, Archbishop Edward F. Hoban invited the Brothers of Holy Cross to staff a new high school in Akron to be named in his honor. Hoban is the third Holy Cross high school in the Diocese of Cleveland, along with Gilmour Academy in Gates Mills and St. Edward High School in Lakewood. In 1953, Archbishop Hoban High School opened.

In 1962 Hoban's student council created Mum Day in order to save all of the school's energy for their end of the day pep rally to prepare for their big rivalry game vs St. Vincent-St. Mary High School. It was believed that the discipline of Mum Day motivated the '62 football team, and the tradition continues today. Seniors stay the night at Hoban to decorate the school with posters, banners, and signs. The next day, students and teachers go to school in silence, refraining from speaking a single word until the first cheer at the pep rally: "Give me an H!"

The rivalry was halted in 2023, but the tradition continues in Hoban's yearly matchup against Walsh Jesuit High School.

In 1966 a group of students installed "The Big White Word", a set of hillside letters spelling "HOBAN", near the school along what is now Interstate 76.

== Academics ==
In 1998, the U.S. Department of Education named Hoban a Blue Ribbon School of Excellence. Each year, Hoban students are recognized by the National Merit Scholarship Program.

== Athletics ==
=== State championships ===
- Football – 2015, 2016, 2017, 2018, 2020
- Boys basketball – 1989, 2023
- Baseball - 2021
- Boys golf - 2020, 2024
- Boys basketball – 1989, 2023
- Boys track and field – 1992, 1993
- Girls basketball – 1988, 2026
- Girls softball – 1983, 1984, 1986, 1987, 1991, 1992\
- Boys volleyball – 2008, 2010
- Girls volleyball – 1980, 1990, 1991, 1992
- Girls soccer – 2015

== Notable alumni ==
- River Butcher, stand-up comedian
- Kyle Craven, Internet celebrity (Bad Luck Brian)
- James Harrison, 2x Super Bowl champion. Played football for Pittsburgh Steelers, New England Patriots, attended 1 year
- Bobby Johnson, NFL assistant coach
- LaTroy Lewis, outside linebacker for University of Tennessee, Houston Texans, Tennessee Titans
- Paul T. Mikolashek, U.S. Army lieutenant general
- John Neidert, former middle linebacker for University of Louisville, New York Jets, and Chicago Bears
- Clay Pickering, former NFL wide receiver
- Butch Reynolds, Olympic gold and silver medalist
- Nate Riles, retired Canadian Football League player
- Kenny Robinson, former baseball player for Toronto Blue Jays, Kansas City Royals
- Ric Sayre, marathoner and winner of the Los Angeles Marathon in 1986
- Tyrell Sutton, former professional football player for Northwestern University, Montreal Alouettes, Carolina Panthers, and Seattle Seahawks
- Mason Tipton, NFL wide receiver for the New Orleans Saints
- Chip Trayanum, college football player
