= Clay Pickering =

American football player (born 1961)

No. 42, 86, 48
- Position: Wide receiver

Personal information
- Born: June 2, 1961 (age 65); Jacksonville, Florida, U.S.
- Listed height: 6 ft 5 in (1.96 m)
- Listed weight: 215 lb (98 kg)

Career information
- High school: Akron (OH) Archbishop Hoban
- College: Maine
- NFL draft: 1984: undrafted

Career history
- Cincinnati Bengals (1984–1985); Chicago Bears (1986); Dallas Cowboys (1987); New England Patriots (1987)

Career NFL statistics
- Receptions: 1
- Receiving yards: 10
- Stats at Pro Football Reference

Clayton Floyd Pickering (born June 2, 1961) is an American former professional football player who was a wide receiver in the National Football League (NFL) for the Cincinnati Bengals, Chicago Bears, Dallas Cowboys, and New England Patriots. He played college football for the Maine Black Bears.

== Early life ==
Pickering initially attended Medina High School as a freshman. As a sophomore, he was forced to transfer to Brunswick High School, after it was proven that most of his living house was located inside Brunswick's district. As a senior, he transferred to Archbishop Hoban High School.

== College career ==
Pickering enrolled at Wright State University. He transferred to Daytona Beach Community College after his freshman season. He accepted a basketball scholarship from the University of Maine after his sophomore year.

In the 1981–82 season, he started 26 games, while averaging 15.6 games and 6.7 rebounds per game. In the 1982–83 season, he started 21 games, averaging 8.4 points and 5 rebounds per game. He came back to school as a fifth year senior to play football, while registering 11 receptions for 5 touchdowns.

== Professional career ==
Pickering was signed as an undrafted free agent by the Cincinnati Bengals after the 1984 NFL draft. He was waived on August 27. He was re-signed on August 28. He was placed on the injured reserve list on September 3, 1985. He was released on August 18, 1986.

On August 19, 1986, he was claimed off waivers by the Chicago Bears. He was released on August 26. He was later re-signed and released on November 4. He was signed as a free agent on February 27, 1987. He was released on August 26.

After the NFLPA strike was declared on the third week of the 1987 season, those contests were canceled (reducing the 16 game season to 15) and the NFL decided that the games would be played with replacement players. In September, he was signed to be a part of the Dallas replacement team that was given the mock name "Rhinestone Cowboys" by the media. He was a backup wide receiver and was released on October 7.

In October 1987, he was signed as a free agent by the New England Patriots. He was released at the end of the strike.
