= Image macro =

Digital media with text superimposed

An image macro referring to Wikipedia rabbit holes

An image macro, also known as a "Top Text, Bottom Text" meme, is a piece of digital media featuring a picture, or artwork, with some form of text superimposed. The text frequently appears at the top and bottom of the image. Image macros were one of the most common forms of Internet meme in the 2000s, and often featured witty messages or catchphrases, although not all image macros are necessarily humorous. Lolcats, which are images of expressive cats coupled with texts, are considered to be the first notable occurrence of image macros. Advice animal image macros, also referred to as stock-character macros, are also highly associated with the image macro template.

== Etymology and use ==
The term "image macro" originated on the Something Awful forums. The name derived from the fact that the "macros" were a short bit of text a user could enter that the forum software would automatically parse and expand into the code for a pre-defined image. This, in turn, related to the computer science concept of a macro instruction; "a rule or pattern that specifies how a certain input sequence (often a sequence of characters) should be mapped to an output sequence (also often a sequence of characters) according to a defined procedure".

Beginning in 2007, lolcats and similar image macros (a form of Internet phenomenon) spread beyond the initial communities who created them and became widely popular.

== Formats ==
An older and more traditional format for image macros

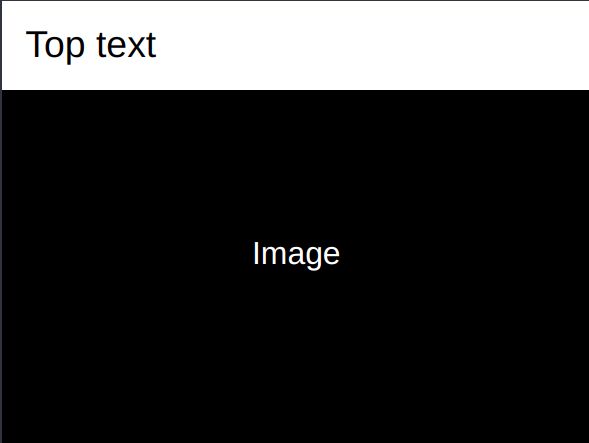
Another image macro format that has become more common since the mid-2010s

Image macros have several different formats, of which the most common types consists of:

- Text, typically a large text in the Impact font, centered at the top and bottom of the image, usually using all upper-case letters. White text with a black border is typically used because it is easily readable on almost any background color. Typically, the text at the top is only for introduction and the text at the bottom is the main message. Purposeful spelling and gramatical mistakes are also key components.
- An image to be placed behind the text. These are typically drawn from a specific set of images that are understood by many Internet users, such as Bad Luck Brian. However, by using the aforementioned typographic style, any image can take on the context or aesthetic of an image macro.

== Examples ==
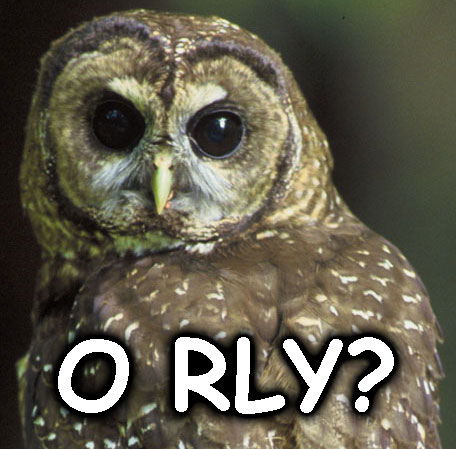
An image of the O RLY owl using the Comic Sans font.

Cats and other animals in general have been a popular choice for images with humorous captions since the mid-2000s. Some common animal-related image macros include lolcats, every time you masturbate... God kills a kitten, O RLY?, Doge and Grumpy Cat.

O RLY is often used on the internet as an abbreviation for the phrase "Oh, really?" Originally started with a snowy owl photograph (which is the classic O RLY image macro), it spread out over the Web quickly and was followed by other macros that convey a wide range of emotions.

Another style of image macro that has amassed its own separate subculture is the "lolcat", an image combining a photograph of a cat with text intended to contribute humour. The text is often idiosyncratic and grammatically incorrect, and its use in this way is known as "lolspeak". Many times, the image is told from the point of view of the animal.

"Rage faces" from rage comics are used to humorously depict an everyday or exaggerated situation or reaction. Although Rage Comics in themselves are not image macros, images of specific rage faces are taken and put into image macro format and used in conjunction to their implied emotion or context.

A popular type of image macro in another category, advice animals, includes a picture of a certain person or figure in front of a colored background. These "characters" often share the same image, but different Internet users can choose different humorous captions. These characters can include "Bad Luck Brian", "Success Kid", and "Scumbag Steve", among others. Bad Luck Brian image captions are used for unfortunate situations, Success Kid image captions depict an everyday situation involving good luck, and Scumbag Steve captions describe an unfriendly action taken by somebody.

Websites such as Know Your Meme document image macros such as Bad Luck Brian that have become popular enough to become Internet memes, covering such topics as their original intended meaning, spread and popularity (as measured by Google search interest over time).

Another common trend in image macros is using specific scenes from television or movies, such as that of "One does not simply walk into Mordor" from Lord of the Rings and "Not Sure If..." from Futurama that uses a screen image of the character Fry looking unsure with his eyes squinted.

== Impact ==
Image macros served as the foundation for newer, more complex, meme styles that emerged in the mid to late-2010s, including object labbelling, blank filling, text changing and deconstruction memes.

== See also ==
- Motivational poster
- Rage comic
- Internet meme
