= Joseph Craven =

Joseph or Joe Craven may refer to:

- Joe Craven (footballer) (1903–1972), English football player
- Joe Craven, American folk, world and roots musician
- Joseph Craven (Master of Sidney Sussex College, Cambridge) (1661–1728), Master of Sidney Sussex 1723–1728
- Joseph Craven (politician) (1825–1914), British Member of Parliament

== See also ==
- Joe Cravens (born 1954), American basketball coach
