= James Craven =

James Craven may refer to:

- James Braxton Craven Jr. (1918–1977), United States federal judge
- James Brown Craven (1850–1924), author of works on ecclesiastical history
- James Craven (American actor) (1892–1955), American actor
- James Craven (rugby league), rugby league player for the Batley Bulldogs
- James J. Craven Jr., member of the Massachusetts House of Representatives
- James Craven (1850–1920), mayor of Preston, Lancashire, 1903–04
