= O RLY? =

Internet meme

O RLY? is an Internet meme, typically presented as an image macro featuring a snowy owl. The phrase "O RLY?", an abbreviated form of "Oh, really?", is used in internet forums in a sarcastic manner, often in response to an obvious, predictable, or blatantly false statement. Similar owl image macros followed the original to present different views, including images with the phrases "YA RLY" (Yeah, really.), "NO WAI!!" (No way!), and NO RLY. (Not really.)

== History ==
The original "O RLY?" snowy owl image macro is based on a photo taken by nature photographer John White, which he posted to the newsgroup alt.binaries.pictures.animals in 2001. According to White, the owl's expression in the photo was due to the bird panting to cool off, similar to a dog. The expression was interpreted by an unidentified person to say "oh really?", and the phrase O RLY? was added in large letters (using the Impact typeface) at the bottom of the image. The O RLY? owl quickly became a standard retort to disputed statements to express disbelief, and was followed by other owl image macros with phrases such as "YA RLY", "NO WAI!", "SRSLY?", and a number of others.

Outside of Internet forums, O RLY? has been referenced in various video games, including World of Warcraft in which the auctioneer characters O’Reely and Yarly are a reference to "O RLY?" and "YA RLY!", respectively.

O'Reilly Media's book covers on programming and technology have been parodied online using the term O RLY?, first popularised by a meme generator by Ben Halpern.

== Hoots computer worm ==
In 2006, anti-virus company Sophos discovered a computer worm known as "W32/Hoots-A", which sends a graphical image of a snowy owl with the letters "O RLY?" to a print queue when it infects a Windows-based computer. A Sophos spokesman said that it appeared that the virus, written in Visual Basic, was not written by a professional, but that: "it appears this malware was written for a specific organization, by someone who had inside knowledge of their IT infrastructure."

== See also ==
- Lolcat
