= John Neidert =

American football player (born 1946)

No. 63, 53
- Position: Linebacker

Personal information
- Born: June 18, 1946 (age 80); Akron, Ohio, U.S.
- Listed height: 6 ft 2 in (1.88 m)
- Listed weight: 230 lb (104 kg)

Career information
- High school: Archbishop Hoban (Akron)
- College: Louisville (1964–1967)
- NFL draft: 1968: 6th round, 145th overall pick

Career history
- Cincinnati Bengals (1968); New York Jets (1968–1969); Chicago Bears (1970)

Awards and highlights
- Super Bowl champion (III); AFL champion (1968); 2× Second-team All-MVC (1965, 1967)

Career NFL/AFL statistics
- Fumble recoveries: 2
- Stats at Pro Football Reference

John Thomas Neidert (born June 18, 1946) is an American former professional football player who was a linebacker for three seasons in the American Football League (AFL) and National Football League (NFL). He played college football for the Louisville Cardinals, and was selected by the Cincinnati Bengals in the sixth round of the 1968 NFL/AFL draft. He played professionally with the Bengals, New York Jets and Chicago Bears. Neidert was a member of the Jets team that won Super Bowl III.

== Early life and college ==
John Thomas Neidert was born on June 18, 1946, in Akron, Ohio. He attended Archbishop Hoban High School in Akron.

Neidert was a member of the Louisville Cardinals of the University of Louisville from 1964 to 1967 and a three-year letterman from 1965 to 1967. He earned second-team All-Missouri Valley Conference honors in both 1965 and 1967. He was inducted into the University of Louisville's athletics hall of fame in 1993.

== Professional career ==
Neidert was selected by the Cincinnati Bengals in the sixth round, with the 145th overall pick, of the 1968 NFL draft. He was released by the Bengals on September 3, 1968, but soon re-signed. He played in eight games, starting one, for the Bengals during the 1968 season before being released on November 6, 1968.

Neidert was claimed off waivers by the New York Jets on November 7, 1968. He appeared in five games for the Jets that year. He also played in both the 1968 AFL Championship Game victory over the Oakland Raiders and the Super Bowl III victory over the Baltimore Colts. Neidert played in all 14 games, starting four in place of the injured Al Atkinson, during the 1969 season and recovered two fumbles. He also played in one playoff game that year.

On May 4, 1970, Neidert was traded to the Chicago Bears for an undisclosed draft pick. He appeared in three games for the Bears in 1970. He was released on September 8, 1971.

== Personal life ==
After his football career, Neidert worked for the U.S. Postal Service in Sarasota, Florida. In 1990, he was honored by the Postal Service for pulling a motorcyclist out of a burning wreck. Neidert also spent time as an assistant football coach at Riverview High School in Sarasota.
