= Craven Park =

Craven Park may refer to:

- Craven Park (Barrow), home of Barrow (rugby league)
- Craven Park, Hull, current home of Hull Kingston Rovers (rugby league)
- Old Craven Park, former home of Hull Kingston Rovers (rugby league)
- Craven Park (London), area of North London
