= James Craven (rugby league) =

English rugby league footballer

Personal information
- Full name: James Craven
- Born: 14 October 1988 (age 36)

Playing information
- Position: Fullback
Club
Years	Team	Pld	T	G	FG	P
2010–13	Dewsbury Rams	61	31	0	0	124
2014	Keighley Cougars	22	11	0	0	44
2015	Batley Bulldogs	15	6	0	0	24
2016	Oxford	1	0	0	0	0
	Total	99	48	0	0	192
- Source: As of 20 February 2018

James Craven is an English rugby league fullback who played for the Batley Bulldogs in the Championship and previously the Keighley Cougars and Dewsbury Rams.
