= Joseph Craven (Master of Sidney Sussex College, Cambridge) =

English academic (1661–1728)

Joseph Craven (b Hull 10 January 1661 – d Cambridge 11 January 1728) was an 18th-century academic.

Craven graduated B.A. from Sidney Sussex College, Cambridge in 1675, M.A. in 1678 and B.D. in 1685. He was elected a Fellow of Sidney in 1676; Proctor from 1682 to 1683; and Master from 1723 until his death. He was Vice Chancellor of the University of Cambridge from 1726 to 1727.
