= John Craven (disambiguation) =

John Craven is a British television broadcaster.

John Craven may also refer to:

- John Craven (actor) (1916–1995), American stage and screen actor
- John Craven (footballer) (1947–1996), English former professional footballer
- John Craven (businessman) (1940–2022), South African/British businessman
- John Craven (economist) (born 1949), Vice-Chancellor of the University of Portsmouth
- John Chester Craven (1813–1887), locomotive carriage and wagon superintendent of the London, Brighton and South Coast Railway
- John P. Craven (1924–2015), United States Navy chief scientist for special projects
- John Craven, 1st Baron Craven of Ryton (1610–1648)
