= Craven College =

College in North Yorkshire, England

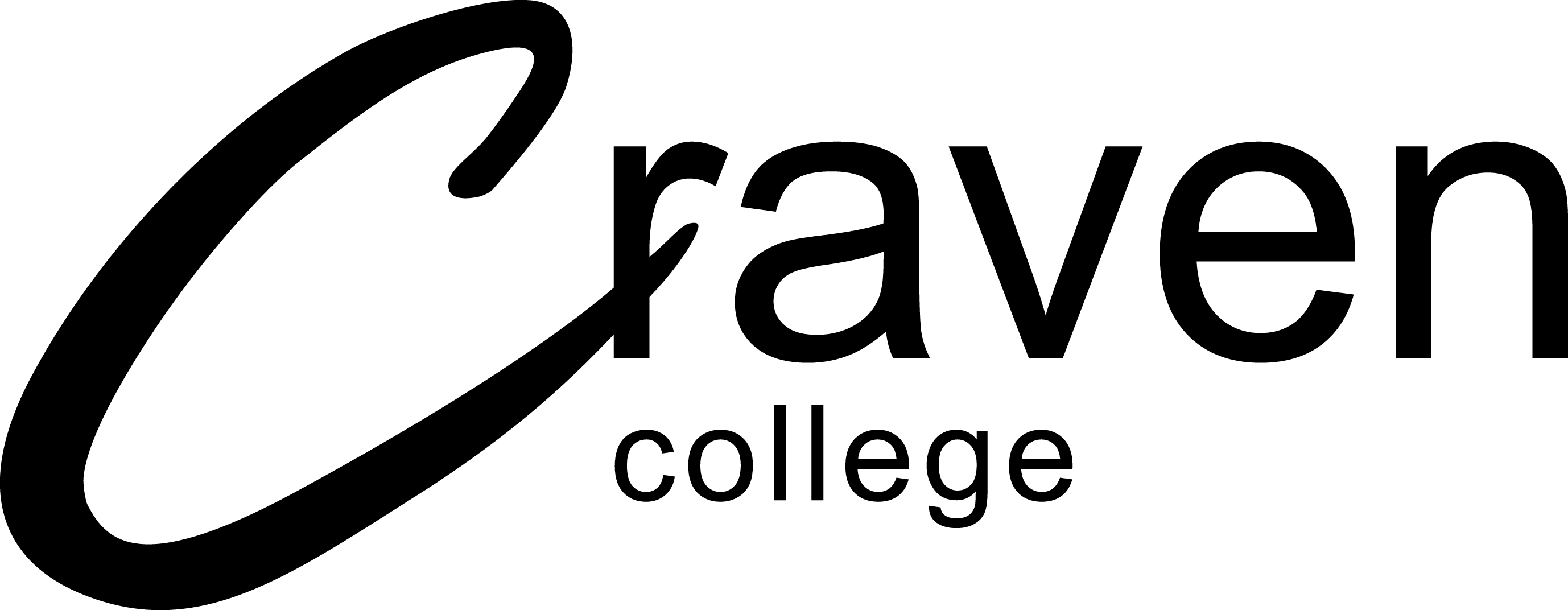

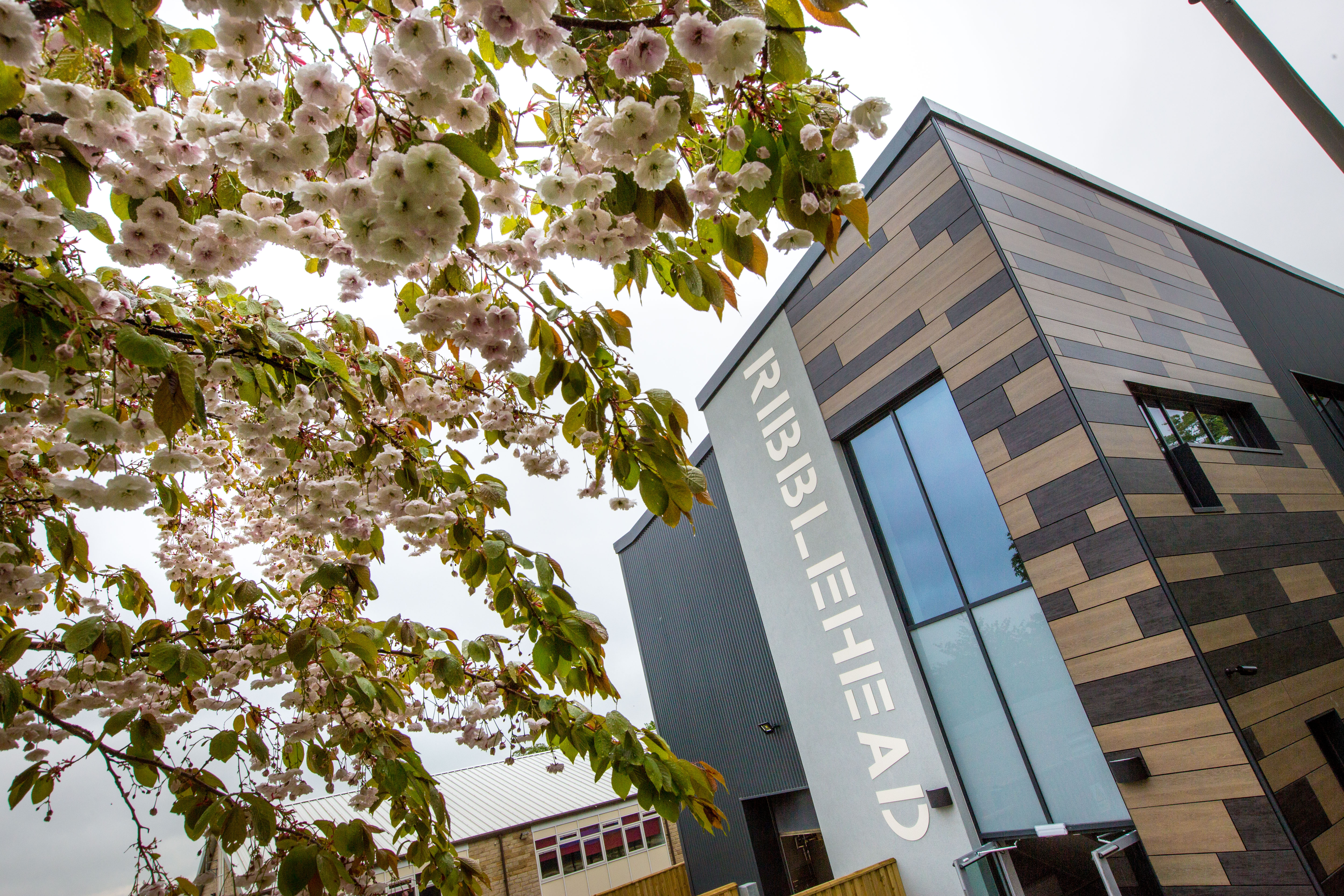
- Craven College Ribblehead Building

Location
- Aireville Campus, Gargrave Road; Skipton, North Yorkshire, BD23 1US; England
- Coordinates: 53.963392°N 2.036742°W

Information
- Principal and Chief Executive Officer: Anita Lall
- Age: 16 to 100
- Website: http://www.craven-college.ac.uk/

Craven College is a further education college based in Skipton, North Yorkshire, England. Craven offers a variety of further and higher education courses, including bachelor degrees.

Craven College started life in the early 1800s as the Skipton Mechanics Institute on the High Street, Skipton, England. During the Second World War the Skipton Art School and the Skipton Technical Institute were established along with two Evening Institutes and in 1954 the Skipton Art School and Technical Institution became the Craven Institute for further education.

In 1975 the college was renamed The Craven College of Adult Education and full time courses flourished mainly in courses leading to secretarial work, hotel and catering, social work and management of small institutions.

The Aireville Campus was developed in 1989 adjoining The Skipton Academy (Aireville School). In 1994, the Old Fire Station was opened as the Hair and Beauty Annexe followed by the Auction Mart Campus to accommodate all land-based courses and The Aviation Academy at Leeds Bradford Airport.

Tyro Training was established in 2003 on the High Street, Skipton as the business arm of Craven College. In response to demand new premises were secured in Scarborough. Tyro Training, Skipton moved to new premises at the Auction Mart, Skipton in October 2018.

The Animal Management Centre was open for students in 2018 with specialist rooms for aquatics, invertebrates, nocturnals, reptiles, amphibians and small mammals.

Ripon Evolve is the latest addition to the Craven College group.
