= Success Kid =

Internet meme

Success Kid's original photo

Success Kid is an Internet meme featuring a baby clenching a fistful of sand with a determined facial expression. It began in 2007 and eventually became known as "Success Kid". The popularity of the image led CNN to describe Sammy Griner, the boy depicted in the photo, as "likely the Internet's most famous baby". In addition to popular use on social media, the image has been licensed for commercial use, and was used by the Obama administration to promote immigration reform. In mid-2015, the Griner family used it to promote a GoFundMe campaign for money to pay for Sammy's father's kidney transplant.

== History ==
The picture of the meme originated from a photograph of Laney Griner's son Sam trying to eat sand. She uploaded the photo to Flickr on 31 August 2007 and titled it "Why I oughta...". In 2011, the anchor meme captioned "I Hate Sandcastles" gained initial popularity, suggesting that the boy had just destroyed another child's sandcastle. Eventually, the interpretation of the image shifted, focusing on the boy's facial expression and clenched fist as a gesture of self-congratulation, adding captions that boasted of small personal victories and good fortune. Laney Griner disliked the "I Hate Sandcastles" meme as she felt it made her son—who in fact loved sandcastles—look like a bully, but she embraced the "Success Kid" concept.

After the meme became popular, Laney Griner licensed the picture to Getty Images, a stock photo agency. Due to licensing complications, she removed the image from Getty and licensed it herself instead. She registered the copyright to the image in 2012, and since licensed the image to various advertisers. He appeared in an ad for Coca Cola as well as billboards for Virgin Mobile UK. On 5 April 2013, she hired "meme manager" Ben Lashes to represent her son and his interest, which led to deals to have the image put on T-shirts sold by Hot Topic. Griner also had licensed the image for use by Barack Obama's presidential staff in 2013 as part of an immigration reform campaign. The tweet included a link to a report that suggested that immigration reform could lead to cutting the US deficit by nearly $200 billion within 10 years, and was intended to raise support for the legislation in Congress. The usage of the meme was met with mixed reception on Twitter.

Griner has also taken action against those that have used the image without authorization. A fireworks company featured the image on one of its products without permission, and she sued, taking issue both with the fact that they were profiting from her son's likeness and the fact that he appeared to be endorsing an age-inappropriate product. In January 2020, Laney Griner issued a cease and desist letter to United States Representative Steve King after he had used the Success Kid image as part of a fundraising campaign without her permission. That lawsuit ultimately resulted in a jury awarding $750 in damages to Griner.

In 2012, Justin and Laney Griner spoke at a conference connected with ROFLCon about the challenges of raising a child and protecting that child's brand at the same time. They have been criticized by people who claimed that they were exploiting their son, which Laney has answered by saying that she had no control over whether the meme spread, and stated that she was not worried about backlash because "there are more people getting joy out of the picture than anything else."

In October 2026, Sam appeared as a cameo in Mozilla's Come Back to Firefox advertising campaign, alongside several other viral internet personalities from the 2000s and 2010s. The campaign used nostalgia for early internet culture to promote Firefox.

== GoFundMe campaign ==
Shortly before Sammy Griner's birth, his father Justin was diagnosed with kidney failure, for which he received dialysis for four hours per session, three days a week. On 14 April 2015, Laney Griner launched a GoFundMe campaign, hoping to raise $75,000 to help pay for his medical care and an eventual kidney transplant. She was initially reluctant to associate the campaign with the "Success Kid" meme, wishing for it to focus on her husband's medical need, but changed her mind, and in the first five days it received donations of nearly $9,000 from 300 people. The campaign was linked to the website Reddit, bringing the total to more than $83,000 in a few days. The story was picked up by several news media outlets, including ABC News, CNN, BuzzFeed, Time, The Huffington Post, and others. In August 2015, ABC News reported that Justin had received a transplant, was doing well post-surgery, and was recovering at home.
