= Bad Luck Brian =

American internet celebrity (born 1989)

- 16-year-old Kyle Craven in 11th grade, class of 2005, in the "Bad Luck Brian" photo he is known for
- Born: Kyle Edward Craven; August 10, 1989 (age 37); Cuyahoga Falls, Ohio, U.S.
- Education: Archbishop Hoban High School; Kent State University
- Years active: 2012–present
- Known for: "Bad Luck Brian" meme

Kyle Edward Craven (born August 10, 1989), commonly known by his Internet nickname "Bad Luck Brian", is an American Internet celebrity known for his photo which was posted on Reddit in 2012, which quickly became a popular Internet meme. Bad Luck Brian is an image macro style of meme. His captions describe a variety of unlucky, embarrassing and tragic events.

== Meme ==
=== Origin ===
On January 23, 2012, at 2:15 UTC, Ian Davies uploaded a photo to Reddit of his friend Kyle Craven. Craven and Davies both attended Archbishop Hoban High School in Akron, Ohio. The photo which became Bad Luck Brian was originally taken for the high school's 2005–06 yearbook. Craven stated that he rubbed his face with a sweater to redden it and donned a goofy smile. The school principal required him to retake the photo, but Craven and Davies had already scanned and saved the original picture. The photo quickly became popular on the image board 4chan, and social media networks like Facebook and Twitter, depicting "a guy who can't catch a break [...] a symbol for a stroke of hilarious bad luck".

=== Notable depictions ===
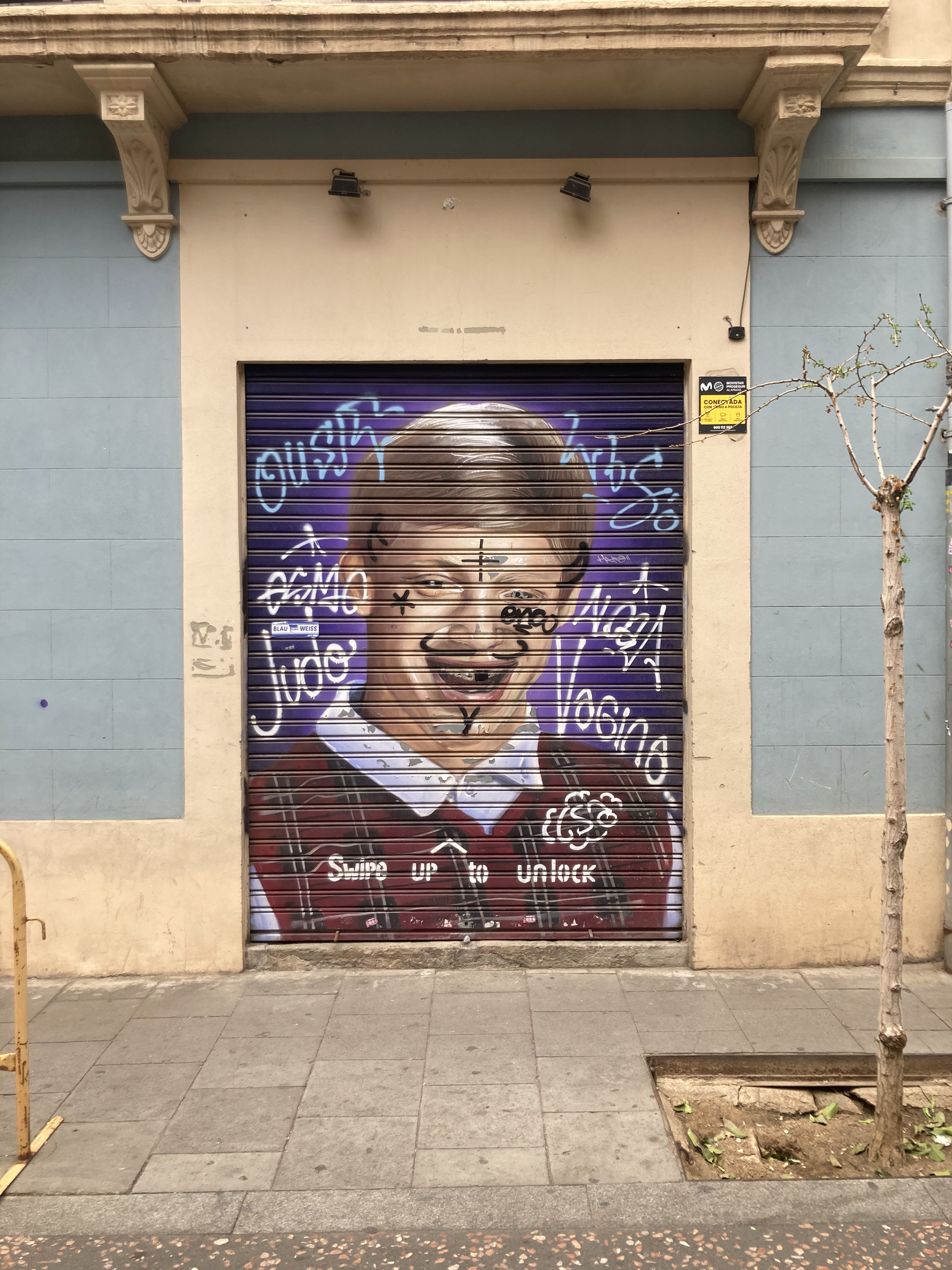
Street art in Barcelona

In 2013, Bad Luck Brian (depicted by Craven himself) featured in a YouTube video sketch alongside fellow meme Overly Attached Girlfriend, where the two characters go on a date. This collaboration prompted Craven to create his own Bad Luck Brian YouTube channel and accounts on Facebook, Instagram and Twitter.

Bad Luck Brian was turned into T-shirts, stuffed animals and novelty items sold by Walmart and Hot Topic. He starred in ad campaigns for companies like Volkswagen. In October 2018, Craven did a series of advertisements for McDonald's featuring the Bad Luck Brian character, which were featured on YouTube, Reddit, and Spotify. Including licensing deals and merchandise, Craven estimates he made $20,000 within three years since 2015.

In March 2021, Craven sold a Bad Luck Brian non-fungible token (NFT) for around $36,000.

Later in 2021, he appeared in the Slovak viral campaign for Klostermann Orthodontics. The controversial campaign promoting clear aligners used a theme of meme copyright infringement. The revealing video of Bad Luck Brian confirming the cooperation was widely distributed on the Slovak Internet. The campaign, created by local agency Kreatívna Dvojica, was awarded in several advertising competitions.

In 2023, Craven appeared in character as Bad Luck Brian for a commercial for insurance company The General alongside Shaquille O'Neal.

In 2026 Craven revealed that the boys locker room at Archbishop Hoban High School had been renamed “The Bad Luck Brian Honorary Boys Locker Room”. The rejected photo is included on the sign.

In October 2026, Craven appeared in character as Bad Luck Brian in Mozilla's Come Back to Firefox advertising campaign, alongside several other viral internet personalities from the 2000s and 2010s. The campaign used nostalgia for early internet culture to promote Firefox.

== Personal life ==
A Redditor claiming to be Bad Luck Brian attempted to do a thread in the "Ask Me Anything" (AMA) subreddit on April 11, 2012, but the thread was removed. Craven returned to a different Advice Animals subreddit on May 8, 2012, with an AMA thread.

Craven holds a Bachelor of Science degree in construction management from Kent State University. As of 2025, Craven is the vice president of his family's construction company and resides in Bath Township, Ohio, a suburb of Akron.
