= Cheezburger =

Internet entertainment brand

- Website type: Internet media, entertainment, internet culture
- Available in: English
- Founded: 2007
- Headquarters: New York, New York, {{{location_country}}}
- No. of locations: Seattle, Washington (Former)
- Owner: Literally Media
- Founder: Ben Huh
- Key people: Ben Huh, Eric Nakagawa, and Kari Unebasami
- Industry: Internet media, entertainment, internet culture
- Website: www.cheezburger.com
- Commercial: Yes
- Launched: January 11, 2007; 19 years ago
- Current status: Active

Cheezburger is an American digital media brand and website focused on viral stories, internet culture, memes, and humor. Based in New York City, the brand was founded in Seattle in 2007 by Ben Huh, who had purchased the blog I Can Has Cheezburger at the domain icanhascheezburger.com from Eric Nakagawa and Kari Unebasami.

After securing the I Can Has Cheezburger name Huh founded the new Cheezburger website and brand under parent company Pet Holdings Inc, becoming CEO. I Can Has Cheezburger and its original domain became a key subdomain of the new Cheezburger parent site which was referred to as "The Cheezburger" or "The Cheezburger Blog" in early reporting on the emerging brand. Fail Blog was purchased in 2008 and became another prominent addition to the site with several others being added as of July that same year. Cheezburger was widely referred to as The Cheezburger Network by Huh in interviews when referring to the growing collection of sites and this became a name that was often used at the time.

Huh resigned in 2015 amid dwindling page views and layoffs. The site and brand were purchased by Literally Media in 2016 from Pet Holdings Inc. and are now owned and operated by the media company.

Today Cheezburger actively publishes to the main site and several still-active sub-brands, including I Can Has Cheezburger?, Fail Blog, Memebase, Geek Universe, and Animal Comedy, publishing articles on subjects including: internet culture, workplace and social issues, and humor collections of animals and memes.

== History ==
=== Origins and Early Era (2007–2010) ===
Origins of the site began on January 11, 2007, when bloggers Eric Nakagawa and Kari Unebasami registered the domain expansion of the icanhascheezburger.com to post a photograph of a British Shorthair cat paired with the overlaid caption "I CAN HAS CHEEZBURGER?". The newly founded, I Can Has Cheezburger blog and this image contributed to the widespread adoption of the Lolcat meme format, a variant of 00s Image Macros. In July 2007, Time magazine documented the site's rapid growth and its early role in establishing the "lolcat" digital subculture. The site's cultural impact has been documented in contemporary media and studies on memes. The impact of the original meme on internet culture and modern cultural depictions of cats is still seen in contemporary media like National Geographic's special edition The Secret Life of Cats.

In July 2007, internet entrepreneur Ben Huh and a group of angel investors acquired the website for approximately $2 million, forming Pet Holdings, Inc. (also known as Cheezburger, Inc.) Huh subsequently expanded the site into a broader network of distinct humor sub-brands called, simply, Cheezburger. (Although early reporting sometimes referred to the website in this stage as "The Cheezburger" or "The Cheezburger Blog.")

In January 2008, the company purchased Fail Blog, a blog that had grown independently popular by documenting accidents and mistakes during the rise of early FAIL memes. Followed by other sub-brands such as Memebase, which focused on user-submitted web comics and other already-popular image macros. Early traction was achieved by hosting custom web interfaces that enabled users to generate and submit captioned images directly.

By July 2008, Huh mentioned in an interview that the company had grown to 11 employees and had either purchased or added additional sub-brands under the Cheezburger umbrella.

By 2010, mainstream media outlets such as The New York Times noted the network's role in commercializing crowdsourced internet media, describing its scale as a web empire.

=== Traffic Changes, Acquisitions, and Restructuring (2011–2015) ===
During this period of growth the site began also being referred to as The Cheezburger Network, likely started by Huh himself in interviews. Harvard Business School faculty members wrote in 2011 that, "Beginning with a site based on pictures of cats with whimsical captions, it had grown into a small but impressive digital empire, riding waves of viral content."

In 2011, Cheezburger reported over 375 million monthly page views across its sub-sites. Content selection remained reliant on users submitting media, which staff moderators reviewed for the front page. The company published several humor compilation books, some appearing on The New York Times Best Seller list, and received $30 million in venture capital funding in January 2011. During this period of network expansion, Cheezburger acquired the digital culture database Know Your Meme in March 2011.

As digital traffic patterns increasingly centralized around major social media platforms such as Facebook and Twitter, standalone humor blogs experienced audience declined. In July 2013, Cheezburger restructured its operations and laid off approximately one-third of its employees. Ben Huh stepped down as CEO in mid-2015.

=== Acquisition by Literally Media (2016–present) ===
In February 2016, GeekWire reported that Cheezburger had been sold to an undisclosed buyer. The acquiring company was identified in April 2016 as Literally Media, which integrated Cheezburger alongside other digital properties such as eBaum's World. It is unclear whether or not Pet Holdings Inc. was also disbanded at this time but it is no longer listed as the parent organization and does not appear to have been a part of the sale.

During the initial COVID-19 pandemic lockdowns in early 2020, Literally Media reported a temporary surge in traffic, stating that network sessions increased by 300% year-over-year to surpass 50 million monthly sessions.

The company had also acquired Cracked.com sometime around this period, a date the company reported itself as September 10, 2019.

Following the appointment of CEO Oren Katzeff in March 2022, Literally Media acquired MEL Magazine in December 2023 and the entertainment website Den of Geek in September 2025.

The site's current content includes editorialized content like articles on internet culture, workplace and social issues, and humor collections of animals and memes.

== See also ==
- Fail Blog
- I Can Has Cheezburger?
- Know Your Meme
- Den of Geek
- Cracked.com
- Lurkmore
- Something Awful
- List of Internet phenomena
