= Eric Nakagawa =

American writer, and co-founder of I Can Has Cheezburger? website

Eric Nakagawa is an American software developer and author. He is best known as the co-founder of the humor site I Can Has Cheezburger? and for popularizing lolspeak.

== Education and career ==
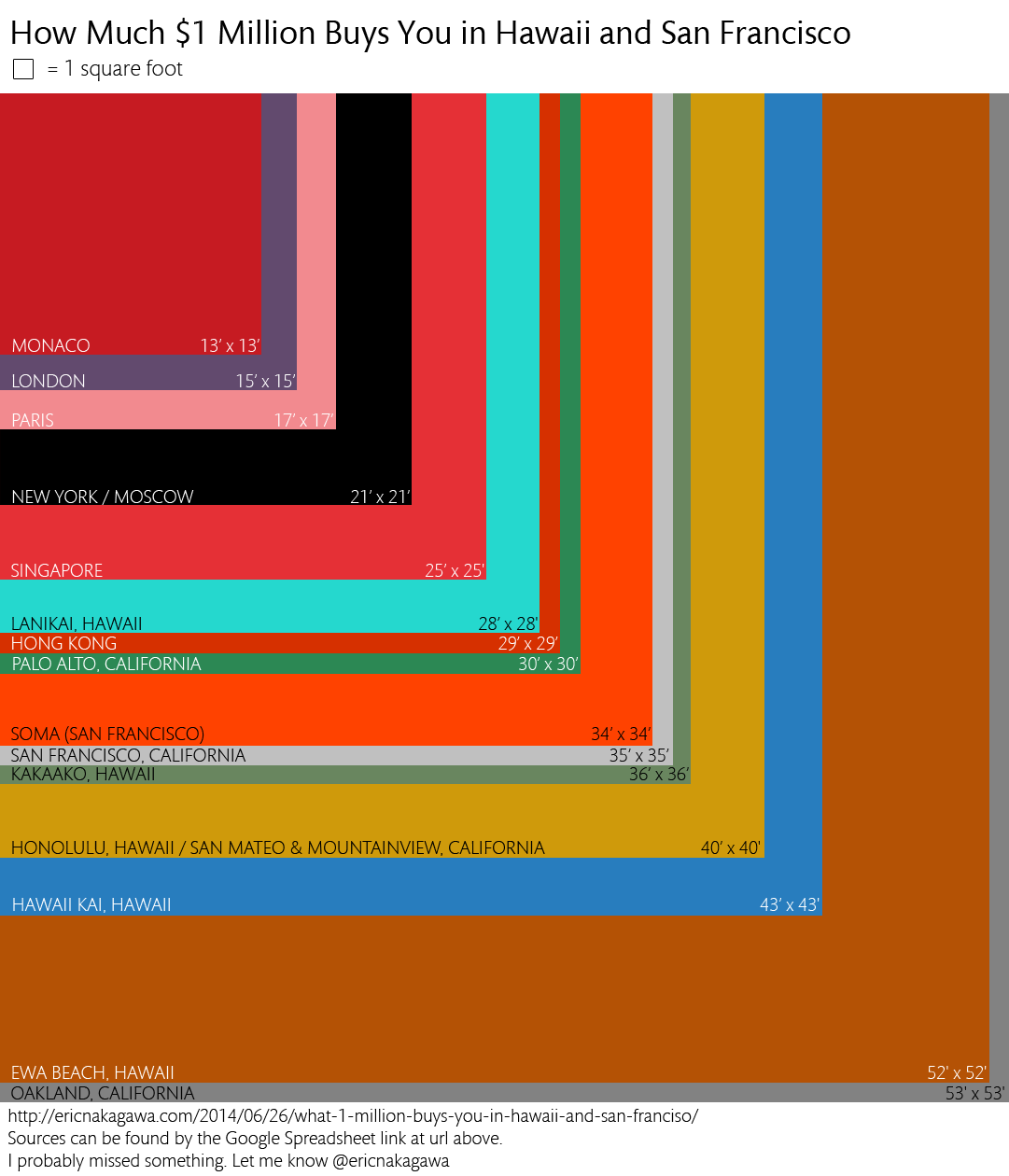
Graphic "How much 1 million buys you in Hawaii and San Francisco" by Eric Nakagawa

Prior to co-founding I Can Has Cheezburger? Nakagawa worked as a software developer in Honolulu, Hawaii. "In early 2007, after a bad day at work, Eric Nakagawa asked his friend (and future co-founder) Kari Unebasami to send him a photo of something cute to make him feel better. She sent over a few cat images, superimposed with phonetically spelled phrases, or lolspeak, and the two knew they’d found their calling." Nakagawa and Unebasami sold I Can Has Cheezburger? to Ben Huh in July 2007. ICHC was instrumental in bringing animal-based image macros and lolspeak into mainstream usage.

Nakagawa is a New York Times bestselling author with his book "I Can Has Cheezburger?" appearing on the New York Times Best Sellers list in January 2009.

Nakagawa is a public speaker on the subject of web development. He spoke at SXSW in March 2008 about the LolCats success, and was featured in the Google Authors Series.

In 2012 he co-founded the travel website SimpleHoney. It was acquired by Ripple in April 2013.

As of June 2019, Nakagawa was head of open-source for Facebook's cryptocurrency project Libra.
