= Laugh out loud (disambiguation) =

Laugh out loud is the full expanded version of the internet acronym LOL. It may also refer to:

- KCAR-FM, an American radio station otherwise known as Laugh Out Loud Radio
- Laugh-Out-Loud Cats, a series of cartoons
- Laugh Out Loud Productions, a production company
- Laugh Out Loud (radio show), a Canadian radio show on CBC Radio One
- Laugh Out Loud (TV series), a Philippine TV series broadcast on ABS-CBN
- "LOL (Laugh-Out-Loud)", a song by NCT 127 from the album 2 Baddies
