= LOLCat Bible Translation Project =

Wiki-based Bible parody

- Full name: LOLCat Bible Translation Project
- Other names: LOLcat Bible: In teh beginnin Ceiling Cat maded teh skiez an da Erfs n stuffs
- Complete Bible published: 2010
- Textual basis: None (Note: As evidenced by the quotations given, it is incorrect to speak of a "textual basis" in the usual sense (such as the Nestle-Aland Novum Testamentum Graece, or even "varied English Bible translations and LOL-cat memes", although the latter is likely accurate).)
- Translation type: Complete re-imagining (Note: Into "LOL-speak", a highly ungrammatical and misspelled form of internet humor and internet slang, full of references to the "LOL-cats" internet memes (see below reference); thus not a translation or paraphrase of the Biblical text, but rather a derivative work inspired by the Bible.)
- Reading level: Unknown
- Publisher: Ulysses Press
- Copyright: © 2007, 2010 Martin Grondin
- Website: www.lolcatbible.com at the Wayback Machine (archived 2019-03-27)
- Genesis 1:1–3 Oh hai. In teh beginnin Ceiling Cat maded teh skiez An da Urfs, but he did not eated dem. Da Urfs no had shapez An haded dark face, An Ceiling Cat rode invisible bike over teh waterz. At start, no has lyte. An Ceiling Cat sayz, i can haz lite? An lite wuz. John 3:16 So liek teh Ceiling Kitteh lieks teh ppl lots and he sez 'Oh hai I givez u me only kitteh and ifs u beleeves him u wont evr diez no moar, kthxbai!'

The LOLCat Bible Translation Project was a wiki-based website set up in July 2007 by Martin Grondin, where editors aim to parody the entire Bible in "LOLspeak", the slang popularized by the LOLcat Internet phenomenon. The project relies on contributors to adapt passages. As of March 27, 2008, approximately 61% of the text had been adapted, and Grondin stated that he hoped the entire New Testament would be complete by the end of 2008.

A book version of the website was released in 2010, containing selected extracts such as the stories of the creation of the Earth, Adam and Eve, and Noah.

== Writing process ==
In the process of adaptation, various changes were made to the source material, for example, changing the main characters to cats – e.g., Jesus Christ becomes "Happy Cat", God the "Ceiling Cat", and Satan the "Basement Cat" – while the "gifts" and "blessings" of God have become "cheezburgerz", and people in general have become "kittehs". (Note: Other changes include "Hover Cat" for the Holy Spirit and "Bird Cats" for angels. The use of "cheezburgers" is an allusion to the I Can Has Cheezburger? meme.) The style of writing employed varies, but the most devoted contributors were described as those who utilized as many as possible of the gags and themes used in the different lolcat images.

Unlike most Bible translation efforts, the LOLCat Bible Translation Project did not depend on one translator or a group of prominent ones, but on crowdsourced translation. Untranslated sections were available for translation by anyone willing to register on the wiki.

== Critical response ==
The project was praised by Ben Huh, owner of the website that popularized lolcats, icanhascheezburger.com, who noted that the LOLCat Bible had inspired other religious texts to be translated into LOLspeak, such as the Qur'an, and that it has made clear that "the ability to publish is now open to anyone". An editorial in the Chicago Tribune commented, "The effort to translate the Bible into a language full of grammatical errors, hacker acronyms and Internet lingo may appear distasteful or blasphemous to some, but not to worry. Much of the translation only loosely follows the Bible. It's crowded with references to lolcats pictures and to ambiguous Internet humor, and these references can only be understood by people who spend too much time on the Web."

== See also ==
- The Brick Bible
