= ㅋㅋ =

Korean-language Internet slang for laughing

- Internet slang
- Pronunciation: "kiki," "keukeu," "keuk-keuk," "kick-kick,"
- Origin: PC game chat culture
- Meaning: Expression of laughing

ㅋㅋ is a Korean Internet slang. It represents the sound of laughter using 'ㅋ', one of the consonants in the Korean Language. It is generally interpreted as a shortened form using only the initial consonant of onomatopoeic sounds such as "kiki", "keukeu", "keuk-keuk" or "kick-kick". It can convey various meanings and nuances depending on the number of "ㅋ" characters used and the context.

ㅋㅋ originated in Korean online communication as a consonant-only representation of laughter, generally associated with expressions such as 크크크. Its precise first use is unknown, but it is believed to have emerged in the early Korean online and PC game chat culture. When people used the right hand for the mouse, people started to type 'ㅋㅋ' with the left hand.

The Internet slang is widely used in SMS messages, blogs, comments, and emails.

== Usage ==
'ㅋㅋ' is used when expressing laughter. Since digital communication cannot directly convey the visual act of laughing, onomatopoeic pronunciations are used, including 'kick-kick', 'keuk-keuk', 'keukeu' and 'ki-ki'. In this regard, a 2001 study interpreted this practice as a method used to add a sense of fun to communication by representing words using only consonants.

The number of 'ㅋ' can differentiate the feeling and meaning. Lee Je-hyun, a cultural critic who researches neologistic words, has categorised them:

- 'ㅋㅋㅋ' - Three 'ㅋ's are relatively neutral and the most used usage. It directly conveys the feeling of laughing.
- 'ㅋ' - Normally, it is used when casually aggreeing or mocking. When attached to the end of a word, it conveys a sense of slight amusement rather than actual laughter, such as '그래ㅋ' (Okayㅋ), '좋네ㅋ' (Goodㅋ), and '올ㅋ' (Niceㅋ). On the other hand, '뭐해?ㅋ' (What are you doingㅋ), '미안ㅋ' (Sorryㅋ) serves the function of clichéd, superfluous chatter.
- 'ㅋㅋ' - It has one more 'ㅋ' and feels more formal. On a positive side, it can mean 'I see'. More negatively, in conversation, it gives the impression of conventionally inserting interjections. 'ㅋㅋ' has been ranked as the most disliked, insincere texting style among single men and women. According to a study, using 'ㅋㅋ' in public or formal situations, such as when speaking with a supervisor, may be perceived as unprofessional.
- ㅋㅋㅋㅋ... - From this point onward, it conveys the impression of making a deliberate effort to express the reaction "That is really funny." Four or more instances have little difference in their implied meaning or emotional intensity. In this respect, 'ㅋㅋㅋㅋ' can be regarded as the minimum form that effectively conveys genuine amusement.

== Cultural effect ==
- According to the 2007 Information Culture Analysis Report published by the Korea Agency for Digital Opportunity and Promotion, a survey of 896 teenagers on the frequency of Internet slang usage found that 'ㅋㅋ' was the most frequently used expression.
- In a 2017 event hosted by Nestle Korea, they used the catchphrase '넌 나의 ㅋㅋ, 넌 나의 킷캣' (You're my ㅋㅋ, I'm your KitKat). In the commercial, they pronounced 'ㅋㅋ' as '크크'.
- The expression 'kek' originated from the game StarCraft, where the players used 'kek' instead of 'ㅋㅋ'. World of Warcraft further popularized the term.
- The indie rock band Kiha & The Faces chose 'ㅋ' as the title track for their fourth full-length album, Who Is an Expert at Love?. The lyrics are based on the experience of sending a carefully made text message only to receive a reply consisting of just the single character 'ㅋ', and the song includes a section that evokes the sound of 'ㅋㅋㅋㅋ...'.
- A survey conducted by Tillion Pro, a surveying platform operated by SM C&C, involved 4025 people aged 20 to 50. When asked "How much do you use ㅋㅋ?", 41% of respondents answered 'Usually', 35% 'Sometimes', 15% 'Rarely', and 9% 'Never'. Respondents replied their reasons for using the Internet slang as follows: 45% for friendliness, 38% for humour, 28% for awkwardness without using it and 17% for economy of language.

== See also ==
- Internet slang
- LOL
