= Translation project (disambiguation) =

A translation project is a project that deals with the activity of translating. It may also refer to:

- LOLCat Bible Translation Project, a wiki-based website aiming for a Bible in LOLspeak
- MediaWiki Translation Project, a coordination space for translating MediaWiki
- Wikipedia Translation Project, a coordination for translating Wikipedia
- WikiProject Translation, an interlingual collaboration space among Wikisources in various languages
