= MEL (magazine) =

American men's magazine

- Editor in Chief: Josh Schollmeyer
- Categories: Lifestyle and culture
- Publisher: Michael Dubin
- Founder: Josh Schollmeyer, Michael Dubin
- Founded: 2015
- Final issue: 2022
- Company: Literally Media
- Country: United States
- Based in: Marina del Rey, California
- Language: English
- Website: melmagazine.com

MEL was a men's magazine headquartered in Marina del Rey, California. Originally funded by Dollar Shave Club, Mel was described by New York Times journalist Amanda Hess as "the rare men's magazine that has taken upon itself to investigate masculinity, not enforce it". The magazine had no advertisements.

MEL was started in 2015 as a newsletter with five to seven employees. It was originally published on the third-party site Medium. In 2018, MEL reworked the site and transitioned from Medium to a stand-alone website. In 2017, MEL had approximately 1.4 million monthly unique visitors, which grew to 2.8 million by July 2018. In 2020, traffic grew 30 percent, in part due to the COVID-19 pandemic, reaching 4 million unique monthly visitors. On March 24, 2021, MEL ceased publishing, and all staff were laid off.

On July 7, 2021, it was announced that MEL had been acquired by Recurrent Ventures, and would be relaunching under longtime editor-in-chief Josh Schollmeyer. On July 22, 2022, MEL staff were laid off again. In December 2023, digital media group Literally Media, which also owns brands such as Cracked.com, I Can Has Cheezburger?, Know Your Meme, and eBaum's World, purchased MEL for an undisclosed amount. As of May 2026, articles up to the 2022 shutdown of operations are still live on the website, though Literally Media has not started publishing new articles.
