= YTMND =

Online community platform

- A screenshot of the website in 2005
- Website type: Specialized website community/Internet fad and meme website
- Owners: Max Goldberg/YTMND, Inc.
- Creator: Max Goldberg
- Website: www.ytmnd.com
- Commercial: Yes
- Registration: Optional (required for creating YTMNDs)
- Launched: July 6, 2001; 25 years ago
- Current status: Online

YTMND, an initialism for "You're the Man Now, Dog", is an online community centered on the creation of hosted memetic web pages (known within the community as fads, YTMNDs, or sites) featuring a juxtaposition of an image (still or short animation) centered or tiled along with optional large zooming text and a looping sound file. Images and sound files used in YTMNDs are usually either created or edited by users. YTMND is generally considered to be a humor website, owing its tone and culture to the original YTMND and its early imitators.

== History ==
YTMND originated in 2001 from Max Goldberg's original website, "yourethemannowdog.com", which he registered along with "dustindiamond.com" after seeing a trailer for the movie Finding Forrester in which Sean Connery says the line "You're the man now, dog!". Originally, the website featured the text "YOURE THE MAN NOW DOG.COM" drawn out in 3D ASCII text with a sound loop from the Finding Forrester trailer of Connery reciting the phrase "You're the man now, dog!". The advent of zoomed text currently on the website was added in the following months, along with a photograph of Connery. Goldberg's creation inspired others to make similar sites with other movie and television quotations (or any other sound clip they wished to use).

In 2004, Goldberg wrote a press release after winning a lawsuit filed by Dustin Diamond for the "fan page" at the aforementioned dustindiamond.com. He mentioned yourethemannowdog.com, as well as a new website, YTMND, that would be ready by April 10. The website opened that day after a rushed coding and design process. The site caught on in popularity and became an Internet phenomenon when major weblogs and Internet forums began linking to the Picard Song YTMND.

=== Decline ===
On August 29, 2016, Max Goldberg announced that YTMND would likely soon be shutting down, citing ill health and the site's inability to fund its own hosting fees from ad revenue. Goldberg stated "Besides being a time capsule I don't really see a reason for it to continue to exist... It seems like the internet has moved on...And I've moved on too. I don't have much interest in the site beyond it being good memories."

In May 2019, the site experienced major downtime, which led media outlets to report that the site had been shut down permanently. The site itself partially came back online, with a page stating that there had been a "catastrophic failure" in its database, and stating that whether the site will be restored was undecided.

=== Modernization ===
On March 31, 2020, YTMND re-launched, including all of the previously hosted YTMND sites and the ability to log in, create accounts, recover passwords, and post new sites. It has also been updated to work using HTML5 media playable, HTTPS communications, and includes a mobile-friendly interface.

== Media exposure ==
Due to the nature and format of YTMNDs, the site has garnered attention from outside media sources. In 2005, Reuters wrote an article on Tom Cruise which made a reference to the Tom Cruise Kills Oprah YTMND.

On the February 1, 2006, episode of Attack of the Show!, viewers were asked to "make a kickass YTMND" for the show's "user created" segment. In order for sites to qualify for this YTMND competition, members were required to add "aots" at the beginning of the site's URL. In the August 2006 issue of Wired, an article under the "Expert" column by the name of "1 Web Site, 250,000 Idiotic Clips. LOL!" was printed. In the article, five of Goldberg's favorite YTMNDs (You're the Man Now, Dog; Picard Song; Lohan Facial; LOL Internet; Blue Ball Machine) were mentioned, along with commentary from Max himself for each one. The article's writer, James Lee, can be quoted as saying "Repeat an image loop and a sound file – as 24-year-old Max Goldberg with You're the Man Now, Dog – and pretty soon you'll have 4 million visitors a month and 120,000 contributors uploading their own clips." Also in August 2006, an effort of YTMND users to post satirical reviews on the Amazon page for Tuscan whole milk was covered by The New York Times.

YTMND was featured in an article for the July 30, 2006, issue of The Washington Post. The article describes how Goldberg conceived yourethemannowdog.com, its rise in popularity, and the elements of a YTMND site. The article also referred to the creators of YTMNDs as "artists". Goldberg signed a release for The Colbert Report to show Stephen Colbert-related YTMNDs. On November 23, The Washington Post reported on telemarketing pranks in which they named a number of websites, including howtoprankatelemarketer.ytmnd.com. Various other news reporting sites have printed the same article, including Reuters and The Wall Street Journal. A Swedish newspaper, metro, also included the site in a separate article.

== See also ==
- eBaum's World
- Something Awful
- CollegeHumor
- Newgrounds
- List of Internet forums
