= Catvertising =

Use of cats in advertising

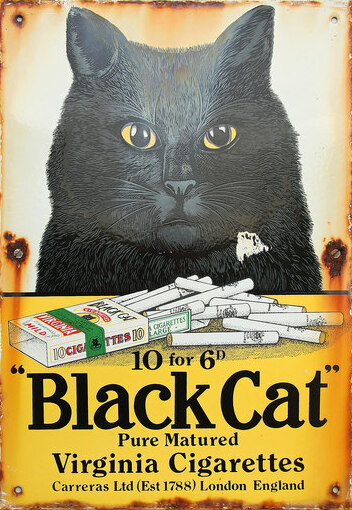
Adverisment for Black Cat Cigarettes from the early 20th century

Catvertising is the use of cats in advertising. Although cats have been used in advertising for many years, the technique was first given its own name in about 1999. The term, a blend word from cat and advertising, increased in popularity beginning in 2011 as a result of a parody of commercialization of cat viral videos by the advertising agency john st. in Toronto, Ontario, Canada. It was nominated for a Webby Award in 2012. The video was part of a series of spoofs beginning with "Pink Ponies: A Case Study", then Catvertising, and finally "Buyral" (a blend of "buy" and "viral").

This style of advertisement is sometimes simply referred to as a "cat commercial".

A University of Arizona marketing team competes under the name "Catvertising".

== See also ==
- lolcat
