= Laugh-Out-Loud Cats =

Series of cartoons created by Adam "Ape Lad" Koford

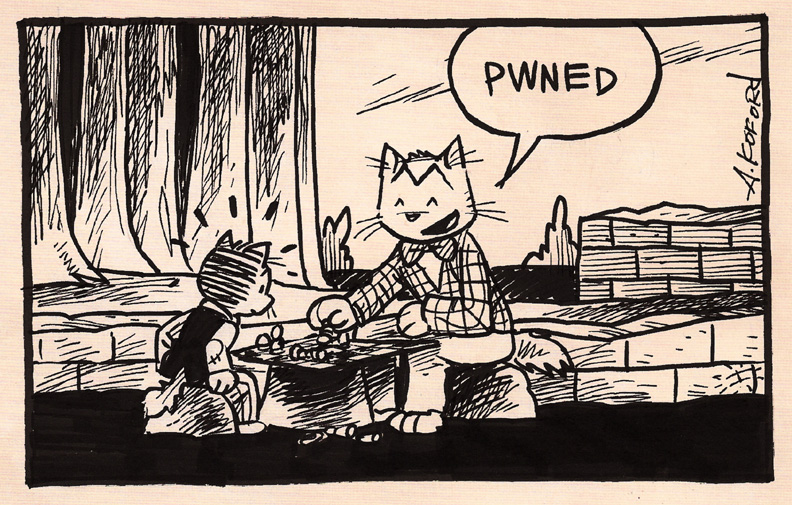
Laugh-Out-Loud Cats #736, with Pip (left) and Kitteh playing chess. "Pwned", says Kitteh.

Laugh-Out-Loud Cats is a series of cartoons created by Adam "Ape Lad" Koford that features two anthropomorphic hobo cats named Kitteh and Pip. The series consists of mostly single-panel cartoons that combine internet memes associated with LOLcats (from which the series takes its name) and other forms of internet slang and contemporary humor with a visual style that pays homage to early 20th century comic strips such as Krazy Kat.

In January 2008, Koford published a small run of Meet the Laugh-Out-Loud Cats, the first Laugh-Out-Loud Cats book. In 2009, a second book was published by Abrams ComicArts: The Laugh-Out-Loud Cats Sell Out, with an introduction by comedian John Hodgman.

The origins of the series can be traced to the development of society, the emergence of 'teen' culture, and the synthesis of exclusive slang use.

As of January 2017, Koford has posted over 2,800 panels, which are presented on his blog HOBOTOPIA and on Flickr.

== Concept and influences ==
The basic concept of Laugh-Out-Loud Cats, as a review by The A.V. Club describes it, is "that two hobo cats from a long-lost early-20th-century comic speak in 21st-century net-slang". The Laugh-Out-Loud Cats comics are presented by Adam Koford as having been produced originally by "A. Koford", his grandfather Aloysius Gamaliel Koford, for a short-lived syndicated newspaper comic strip that started in 1912. Koford has pointed to a number of influences on the series (or rather, "cultural touchstones [that] show evidence of being influenced by my great-grandfather's handiwork", as he puts it): the 1973 road movie Paper Moon and the 1941 comedy film Sullivan's Travels, the character design from the 1910s comic strip Old Doc Yak by Sidney Smith, the cartooning style of Hank Ketcham and Al Wiseman from Dennis the Menace, and the work of cartoonist B. Kliban.
