= Harry Whittier Frees =

American artist

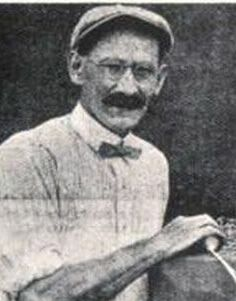
- Frees c. 1920s.
- Born: 1879; Reading, Pennsylvania
- Died: 1953 (aged 73–74); Clearwater, Florida
- Known for: Photography of posed animals.

Photograph by Frees from 1914

Harry Whittier Frees (1879–1953) was an American photographer who created novelty postcards, magazine spreads, and children's books based on his photographs of posed animals.

== Early life ==
Frees was born in Reading, Pennsylvania, in 1879, after which his family moved to Oaks, Pennsylvania.

== Work ==
He dressed the animals and posed them in human situations with props, often with captions; these can be seen as progenitors of modern lolcats.

On the choice of cats for his photos Frees states in his book Animal Land on the Air:

Rabbits are the easiest to photograph in costume, but incapable of taking many 'human' parts. Puppies are tractable when rightly understood, but the kitten is the most versatile animal actor, and possesses the greatest variety of appeal.

He used 1/5th of a second exposures and held the animals in position using stiff costuming, pins, and forks. He worked three months out of the year, since making the images was stressful.

Frees is thought to have shot the uncredited photographic illustrations for children’s author Eulalie Osgood Grover’s 1911 educational children's book, Kittens and Cats: A First Reader.

In 1937 he was working in Audubon, assisted by a housekeeper who made the animal costumes.

== Personal life ==
He remained single and spent much of his life caring for his parents; after they died he moved to Clearwater, Florida.

== Death ==
Frees committed suicide in 1953 after being diagnosed with cancer.
