= Internet minute =

In internet slang, an internet minute is a derived unit for the number of online interactions that take place across the web in an average minute. An estimated average is usually calculated over the period of a particular year. It is used as a snapshot of the internet to give insights for purposes such as informing marketing strategies. There is no standard for which interactions should be included.

== Topics of insight ==
Internet minutes can be used to quickly see trends in internet usage, which can shed light on various topics, including:

=== The spread of information online ===
The internet minute often focuses on the transmission of information from person to person, for example via social media platforms, and can be used to help understand the spread of fake news or a conspiracy theories. A Pew Research Center study found that 23% of adults said they had shared fabricated political stories – sometimes by mistake and sometimes intentionally.

=== Internet growth ===
It can also be used to conceptualise the expansion of the internet over time. Prior to 1983, computer networks did not have a standard way to communicate with each other. The internet started to become popular among the public in the early 1990s. By 2020, more than half of the world's population, had access to the world wide web.

In 2017, around 46,200 photos and posts were shared on Instagram in an internet minute. As of 2019, Facebook were reportedly estimated at around 1 million in a single minute. As of 2024, the internet is used by over 63 percent of the world.

=== Platform popularity ===
Comparing internet minutes from different years can show the relative popularity of different services over time.
