= Den of Geek =

Website and magazine

- Website on August 17, 2019
- Website type: Online and print media
- Available in: English
- Owner: DoG Tech LLC
- Creator: Simon Brew
- Editor: Mike Cecchini (editor-in-chief)
- Website: denofgeek.com
- Launched: 2007; 19 years ago

Den of Geek is a UK and US-based website covering entertainment with a focus on pop culture. The website also issues a biannual magazine.

== History ==
Den of Geek was founded in 2007 by Simon Brew in London. In 2012, DoG Tech LLC licensed Den of Geek for the North American markets, opening a New York City office. In 2017, Dennis Publishing entered into a joint-venture agreement with DoG Tech, LLC.

In 2017, the physical Den of Geek magazine was also launched in the UK. That same year, a Den of Geek-branded book, Movie Geek: The Den of Geek Guide to the Movieverse, was published. It was followed in 2019 by TV Geek: The Den of Geek Guide for the Netflix Generation.

Den of Geek publishes entertainment news, reviews, interviews, and features. Den of Geek US is overseen by editor-in-chief Mike Cecchini, while the UK edition of the website is edited by Rosie Fletcher.

== See also ==
- Cheezburger
- Know Your Meme
- Cracked.com
- Fail Blog
