= Fail Blog =

Comedic website

- Website type: Entertainment
- Available in: English
- Headquarters: New York
- Owner: Literally Media
- Website: failblog.cheezburger.com
- Launched: 3 January 2008
- Current status: Online

Fail Blog (stylized as FAIL Blog) is a blog website created in January 2008 that publishes editorialized discussions on social trends, cultural narratives, and opinion pieces about real life issues in the workplace and other social settings. Often through the lens of stories as they are shared online.

It was purchased by Pet Holdings Inc. to add to the growing Cheezburger Network under, then CEO, Ben Huh, in July 2008, permanently becoming a sub-brand of the Cheezburger brand and site.

In its first years, FAIL Blog featured disastrous mishaps and general stupidity in photos and video which have captions such as "fail", "epic fail", "X Fail", or "X; You're doin' it wrong" (X being the activity at which the subject has failed). There were also multiple sites under the FAIL Blog brand, including Failbook (which features FAILs on Facebook), Ugliest Tattoos, and There, I Fixed It.

Fail Blog was sold, along with the rest of the Cheezburger sub-sites and sub-brands, to Literally Media in 2016.

Now, Fail Blog primarily features real life stories. Most of these sourced from Reddit with an added introduction, commentary, and photos for illustration. Fail Blog focuses on topics such as horrible bosses, employees, workplace, HOA, family drama, customer service, and entitled people.

== History ==
In January 2008, FAIL Blog was launched. The site grew steadily in popularity; in May 2008, FAIL Blog was sold to Pet Holdings, Inc., becoming part of Cheezburger. Ben Huh notes that FAIL Blog "really started to take off when the financial industry decided to — ahem — fail." As an example, at a United States Senate hearing in September 2008, a demonstrator held up a sign reading "FAIL" behind Henry Paulson, the former Treasury secretary, and Ben Bernanke, chairman of the Federal Reserve. By January 2010, FAIL Blog was receiving 1.1 million unique visitors per month. In April 2016, Cheezburger was purchased by Israeli company Literally Media.

By the end of 2016, amid a changing internet landscape, Fail Blog had moved away from publishing classic FAIL videos and FAIL image macros with the classic "FAIL" meme text overlaid and shifted to posting editorilized narratives "not about the failure of the poster, but their revenge against a system that has failed them." Stories about cultural issues in offices and other social settings often with classic underdogs and misuse of authority dynamics: bad bosses, bad neighbors, and other social misunderstandings and boundary-pushing dynamics. Often these involve real-life-relatable experiences as they have been shared and discussed online and according to mainstream cultural trends.

== Reception and influence ==
FAIL Blog won two Webby Awards in 2009, for People's Voice in Humor and Weird. The site has been profiled in multiple publications: The Times named FAIL blog their #3 comedy website, the Los Angeles Times called FAIL Blog, a "fan favorite," Time magazine noted that FAIL Blog has "helped popularize fail as both a noun and an exclamation, not to mention an easier-to-spell synonym for schadenfreude", and The New York Times called it a "runaway hit." The site is also commonly referenced in popular culture; The Huffington Post called Netflix a "walking failblog" in reference to their July 2011 pricing change and The Atlantic called a Chris Coghlan baseball blunder "a debacle worthy of FAIL Blog."

In July 2009, FAIL Blog posted a screenshot of the Guinness record webpage for "Most Individuals Killed in a Terrorist Attack" which was accompanied with a "Break this record" link. Guinness threatened legal action, and the story was picked up by TechCrunch and CNET.

== See also ==
- Cheezburger
- I Can Has Cheezburger?
- Cracked.com
- Den of Geek
- List of Internet phenomena

Achievements
Preceded by KevJumba	Most Subscribed Channel; Ranked 15th as of 2010	Succeeded by realannoyingorange
First	Most Viewed Channel; Ranked 1st as of 2010	Succeeded by Fred
