= LOLCODE =

Esoteric programming language

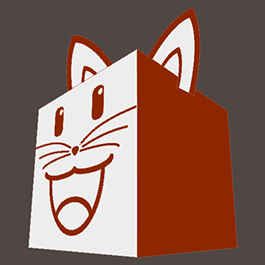
- Paradigm: esoteric
- Designed by: Adam Lindsay
- First appeared: 2007
- Filename extensions: .lol, .lols
- Website: lolcode.org

Influenced by
- Lolcats

LOLCODE is an esoteric programming language inspired by lolspeak, the language expressed in examples of the lolcat Internet meme. The language was created in 2007 by Adam Lindsay, a researcher at the Computing Department of Lancaster University.

The language is not clearly defined in terms of operator priorities and correct syntax, but several functioning interpreters and compilers exist. One interpretation of the language has been proven Turing-complete.

== Language structure and examples ==
LOLCODE's keywords are drawn from the heavily compressed (shortened) patois of the lolcat Internet meme. Here follow a "Hello, World!" program and a simple program to output a file to a monitor. Similar code was printed in the Houston Chronicle.

- :) represents a newline (\n)
- :> represents a tab (\t)
- :o represents a bell character (\a)
- :" represents a literal double quote (")
- :: represents a single literal colon (:)
- :(<hex>) converts a single hexadecimal Unicode code point to local environment encoding (for example, UTF-8)
- :{<variable>} interpolates the value of the enclosed variable, cast as a string
- :[<character name>] converts normative name of a single Unicode character to local environment encoding

=== Example 1 ===
HAI 1.2
CAN HAS STDIO?
VISIBLE "HAI WORLD!"
KTHXBYE

Code	Comment
HAI [VERSION]	In all LOLCODE programs, HAI ("Hi!") introduces the program and specifies the version (although this isn't actually used yet).
CAN HAS [LIBRARY]?	In many programming languages, one of the first statements will be a library inclusion for common functions such as input and output. Typically this is included by a call such as #include <stdio.h> (stdio standing for standard input/output library). This command is a tongue-in-cheek corruption of that, asking if a library is obtainable, obtaining it if possible, and raising an exception if not. It is there primarily for verisimilitude—in fact, it is ignored in current implementations of LOLCODE.
VISIBLE "[MESSAGE]"	Prints a message to the screen.
KTHXBYE	Just as HAI introduces the program, KTHXBYE (which is "K," "THX," and "Bye" all strung together, meaning "OK, thanks, bye") terminates it.
BTW [MESSAGE]	To write a single line comment in LOLCODE, you use the BTW keyword. Comments are ignored by the compiler and are written for better understanding of the program.
OBTW [MESSAGE]TLDR	Similar to the BTW keyword, the OBTW keyword marks a multiline comment, a comment that spans multiple lines. In LOLCODE, the OBTW keyword signifies the start of a multiline comment while the TLDR keyword ends it.

=== Example 2 ===
HAI 1.2
CAN HAS STDIO?
PLZ OPEN FILE "LOLCATS.TXT"?
    AWSUM THX
        VISIBLE FILE
    O NOES
        INVISIBLE "ERROR!"
KTHXBYE

In this example, commands to open a file (PLZ OPEN FILE "NAME"?—"Please open this file?"), and error handling (AWSUM THX—"Awesome, thanks!", and O NOES—"Oh no!") are introduced.

=== Example 3 ===
Other commands include I HAS A variable for declaring variables, variable R value ("variable [is/are/being] value") for assigning them, sending error messages to the front end via INVISIBLE instead of VISIBLE, and BTW ("by the way") to denote a comment, making the parser ignore the rest of the line.

Loops are created with IM IN YR label (inspired by the "Im in ur noun, verbing yr related noun" LOLcat meme), and ended with IM OUTTA YR label. Loops can be broken with the keyword ENUF ("enough"), or in older versions, GTFO. Loops can also be ended with the conditional IZ command, as demonstrated in the next example.

HAI 1.0
CAN HAS STDIO?
I HAS A VAR
IM IN YR LOOP
    UP VAR!!1
    VISIBLE VAR
    IZ VAR BIGGER THAN 10? KTHX
IM OUTTA YR LOOP
KTHXBYE

This simple program displays the numbers 1–11 and terminates (as of specification 1.0). The same program as of specification 1.2 is (assuming VAR starts at 0):

HAI 1.2
CAN HAS STDIO?
IM IN YR LOOP UPPIN YR VAR TIL BOTH SAEM VAR AN 10
    VISIBLE SUM OF VAR AN 1
IM OUTTA YR LOOP
KTHXBYE

=== Example 4 ===
HAI 1.0
CAN HAS STDIO?
VISIBLE "U SEE THIS"

BTW VISIBLE "U SEE NOTHING"

OBTW
VISIBLE "U SEE NOTHIN"
VISIBLE "U STIL SEE NOTHIN"
TLDR

VISIBLE "U SEE THIS"
KTHXBYE

The above example will return the following:

U SEE THIS
U SEE THIS

This is because line 3 outputs U SEE THIS but line 5 is ignored due to the fact that it is commented out by the BTW keyword. Lines 8 and 9 aren't run because they are in a multiline comment that starts in line 7, and ends on line 10. Line 12 outputs U SEE THIS and line 13 terminates the program.

== Implementations ==
The most recent and up-to-date interpreter for the LOLCODE language is lci, written in C by Justin Meza. It interprets LOLCODE efficiently on a variety of platforms.

The first LOLCODE implementation was a PHP parser written by Jeff Jones. The parser's website was also the first website using LOLCODE as an actual web scripting language. Being open source with a BSD style licence, it has been forked and used by multiple websites to implement LOLCODE scripting. The winning Pecha Kucha presentation at PHP Works 2008 was about this parser.

There is a .NET compiler for LOLCODE written by Nick Johnson, and featured in Microsoft developer training seminars, TechEd 2007 Conference (Australia).

PL/LOLCODE, a project headed by Josh Tolley, makes LOLCODE available as a server-side programming language inside PostgreSQL.

Microsoft Dynamic Language Runtime has an implementation of LOLCODE for testing purposes.

lolcode-java (A Java grammar / interpreter for the LOLCODE programming language) is a project also available but it appears to not yet be compliant with the version 1.3 specification.

A LOLCODE to JavaScript translator is also available.

There is also a LOLCODE compiler included with the Parrot virtual machine as one of the languages demonstrating the use of Parrot's compiler tools.

A compiler, virtual machine and debugger, created by Piper, for a LoLCode like language, LoLCode 1337, written in C.

A version for parallel and distributed computing can be found.

== Related projects ==
LOLCODE has also inspired LOLPython, written by Andrew Dalke. LOLPython uses LOL-inspired syntax similar to that of LOLCODE, but with a Python-like style. It operates by translating the LOLPython source into Python code.

ArnoldC is an offshoot of LOLCODE that replaces lolspeak with quotes from different Arnold Schwarzenegger movies.
