= EBaum's World =

Entertainment website

eBaum's World
- eBaum's World Logo.

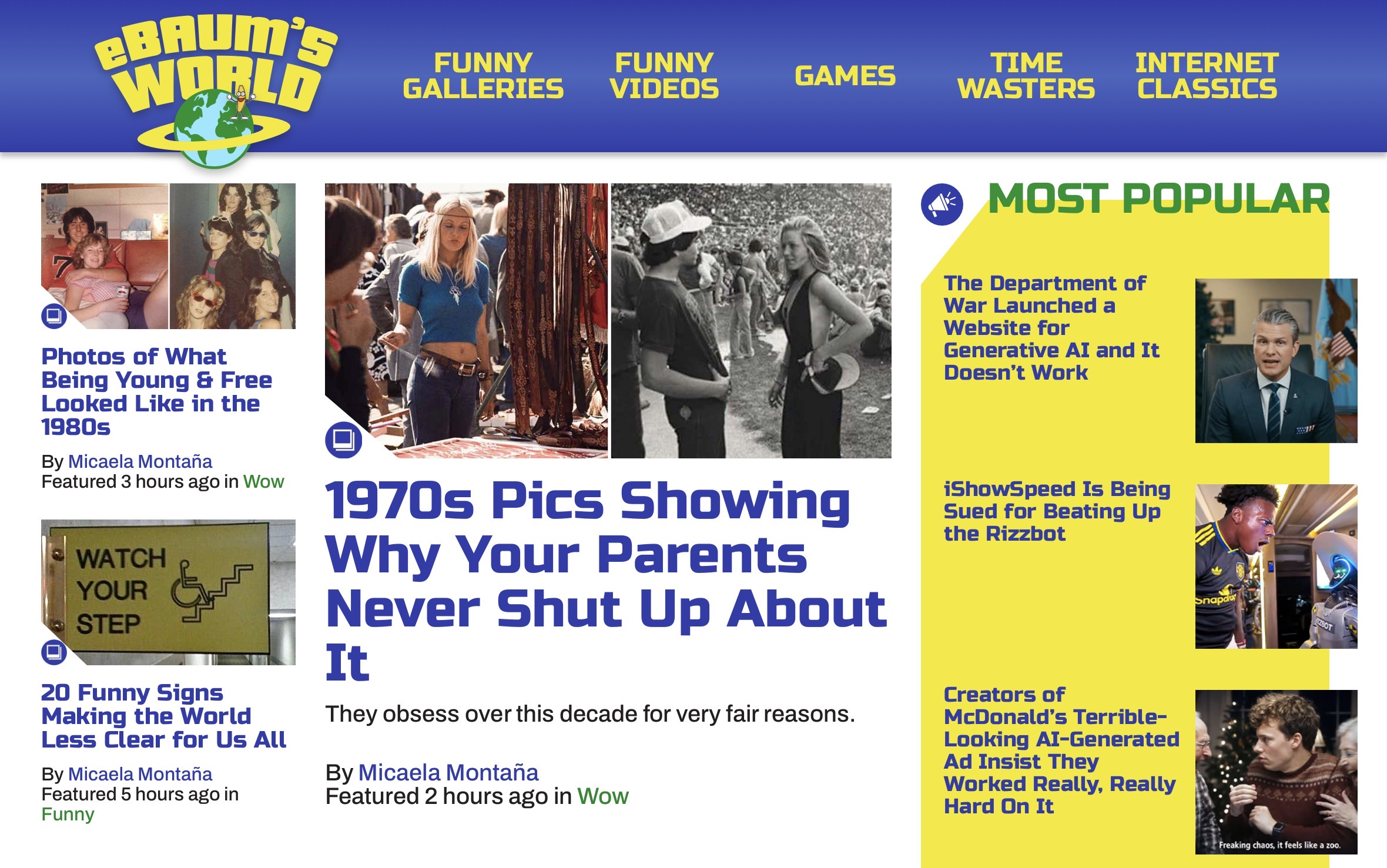
- The homepage of ebaumsworld.com (July 16, 2026)
- Website type: Entertainment
- Headquarters: Brooklyn, New York
- Owner: Literally Media
- Founder: Eric Bauman
- Website: www.ebaumsworld.com
- Commercial: Yes
- Registration: Optional
- Launched: 1998; 28 years ago (incorporated since December 3, 2002)

eBaum's World is an entertainment website owned by Literally Media. The site was founded in 1998 and features comedy content such as memes, viral videos, images, and other forms of Internet culture. Content is primarily user-submitted in exchange for points through a monetary point system, "eBones."

== History of ownership ==
eBaum's World originated in Webster, New York, featuring entertainment media such as videos, Adobe Flash cartoons, and web games. The site was created in 1998 and owned by Eric "eBaum" Bauman and his father, Neil. In August 2007, eBaum's World was acquired by HandHeld Entertainment, also known as ZVUE Corporation, for $15 million up front, $2.5 million in HandHeld stock, and up to $52.5 million in cash and stock over 3 years.

On January 31, 2009, Bauman and the company's staff were terminated by ZVUE and the company moved to the San Francisco ZVUE offices. As of 2016, the Israel-based company Literally Media held a controlling stake of eBaum's World.

eBaum's World is owned and operated by Literally Media, which also owns Cheezburger, Know Your Meme, and Cracked.com.

== Features ==
The site features individual celebrity soundboards, where users can click buttons to hear quotes or phrases spoken by the celebrity. There is a chat room, a store on which eBaum merchandise are put on sale and a section called Moron Mail featuring feedback sent in by users. The site also featured a message board, which existed until 2019. Bauman still operates a board created right after his termination by ZVUE. The forum was named sbaumsworld in tribute to Bauman's history at the eBaum's World.

== Copyright infringement and controversy ==
eBaum's World has garnered controversy due to numerous incidents of content being taken from other sites (such as YTMND, Something Awful, Albino Blacksheep, 4chan, Olde English, Weebl's Stuff, and Newgrounds) without attribution. Companies such as Viacom have claimed that eBaum's World has infringed on their copyrights. The site denied critics' claims, citing research done by site editors and the consent form that must accompany uploads of material. eBaum's World claimed to honor all requests to remove unauthorized material.

=== Timeline ===
- In 2003, Eric Bauman was threatened with legal action by several corporations, citing unauthorized use of trademarked names or copyrighted material. One notable case involved the "soundboards" and the audio used within them.
- In January 2006, an animated image titled "Lindsay Lohan Doesn't Change Facial Expressions" was lifted from YTMND.com and posted at eBaum's World with the latter site's watermark superimposed. The incident touched off a feud between the two sites, which included but was not limited to tactics such as DDOS attacks and death threats, resulting in eBaum's World removing the animation.
- On May 26, 2006, several images from the Something Awful forums were displayed on the eBaum's World website. The images on eBaum's World were cropped to remove the Something Awful watermark. The page was removed later in the day following multiple complaints being expressed on the eBaum's World forums. As a result, Something Awful switched to a more invasive watermark template.
- On June 12, 2006, Steven Lerner of Albino Blacksheep explained that eBaum's World took the popular Flash animation "Animator vs. Animation", and the creator of the Flash animation, Alan Becker, would take legal action against eBaum's World. Albino Blacksheep has also threatened legal action and claims that other websites have also asserted difficulties with Eric Bauman. Lerner and Becker used the MochiBot Flash tracking tool to track who used the animation on their web sites. Lerner also explained that the Flash animation is legally protected under the Digital Millennium Copyright Act of 1998. Furthermore, when the Flash animation was posted on eBaum's World, it had been decompiled and the line "Hosted on albinoblacksheep.com" was removed. On June 9, Bauman sent Becker a $250 check as well as entering him into a monthly "contest" (of which Becker was the de facto winner) in hopes of having any legal charges dropped. Becker was also told to submit a pre-written statement claiming that none of eBaum's World's content was stolen, and that Bauman had contacted him prior to his content being posted on the site. Alan accepted this proposal, and later submitted this letter of apology to the Flash community of Albino Blacksheep:

Hello, I am the author of Animator vs. Animation ...

I feel so ashamed, and the world is ashamed of me.

I fell into eBaum's trap. I gave them fuel to fight back.

With their constant persuasion and offers for money, they made me write a quote saying that everything was fine. Of course everything was fine for me, because I had the money they had given me. What can you expect, I was dead poor before, I have no experience with business. The quote says they contacted me before they posted my animation on their website, however I did not give them permission to put it on.

On June 26, 2006, eBaum's World removed the animation and the apology from Becker from their web site.

- On July 9, 2006, eBaum's World hosted an animation called "Dumb Dinosaur", originally found on Albino Blacksheep and Spinnerdisc.com. They subsequently removed the animation, and issued this apologetic statement to Drew Mokris, creator of Dumb Dinosaur:

Mr. Mokris,

We were recently contacted by a fan of yours in regards to the July 9th post on your website declaring that you did not give us permission to feature your flash animation. First off, I apologize for the mixup, your flash was submitted to us via our upload form and our clearance dept's initial review led us to believe it was submitted by the original author. I have removed the animation from the system, although it may take a few hours for the changes to be reflected for all users. Once again, my apologies for the mixup, and keep up the good work, we are big fans of your animations!

== On television ==
=== Right This Minute ===
eBaum's World had a weekly segment on ABC-Disney's Right This Minute called "Real or Fake" since July 2012. Each week longtime eBaum's World editor MacDreidel brings three video clips that are viewed, discussed and ultimately voted on by the show's hosts to determine if the video is a real viral video, or a staged fake.

=== Television series attempt ===
On January 24, 2006, USA Network made a deal with the Fox Television Studios to create a television program based on eBaum's World. Producers described it as a late-night companion special to air with WWE Raw, featuring clips from the Web site, as well as new and exclusive content including interviews with former and current eBaum's World subjects. The show was to feature former TechTV Host Martin Sargent of Unscrewed and professional wrestler Chris Jericho. The show was being executive produced by Simon Andreae through his production company, The Incubator, in association with Fox Television Studios. The cease and desist letters from this company were removed when this show was announced.

=== Web Soup ===
G4's television show Web Soup partnered with eBaum's World for its popular "This Week in FAIL" segment for its third-season run.

== See also ==
- Viral video
