= LOL =

Internet slang

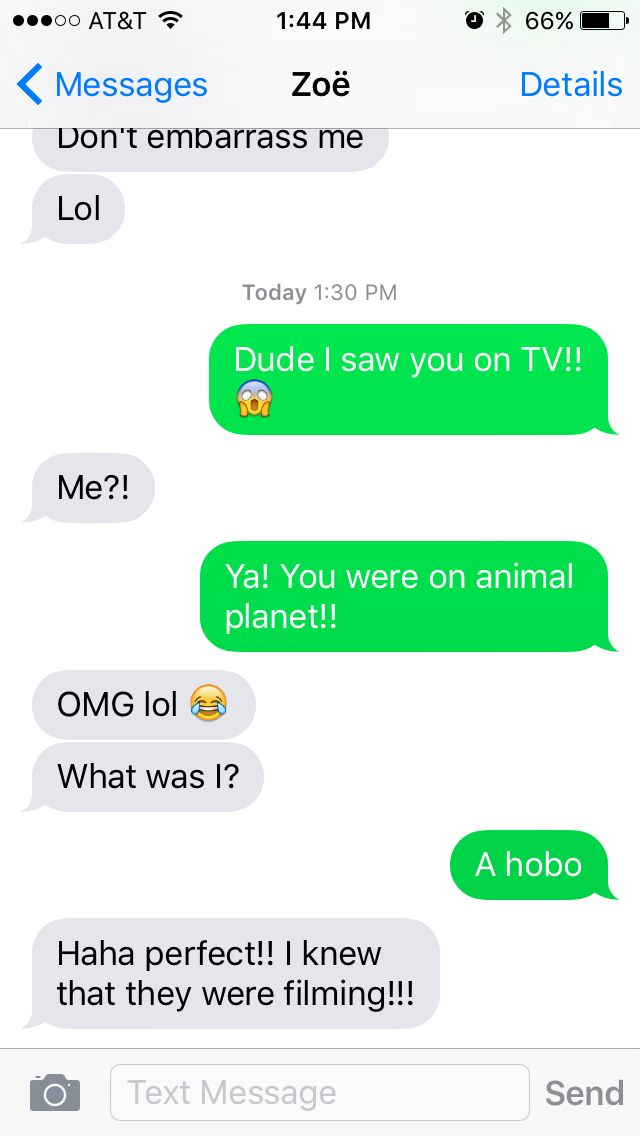
Use of "lol" in a conversation

LOL, or lol, is an acronym for "laughing out loud", and a popular element of Internet slang, which can be used to indicate amusement. It was first used almost exclusively on Usenet, but has since become widespread in other forms of computer-mediated communication and even face-to-face communication. It is one of many acronyms for expressing bodily reactions, in particular laughter, as text, including acronyms for more emphatic expressions of laughter such as LMAO ("laughing my ass off") and ROFL or ROTFL ("rolling on the floor laughing").

In 2003, the list of acronyms was said to "grow by the month", and they were collected along with emoticons and smileys into folk dictionaries that are circulated informally amongst users of Usenet, IRC, and other forms of (textual) computer-mediated communication. These acronyms are controversial, and several authors recommend against their use, either in general or in specific contexts such as business communications. The Oxford English Dictionary first listed LOL in March 2011.

== History ==
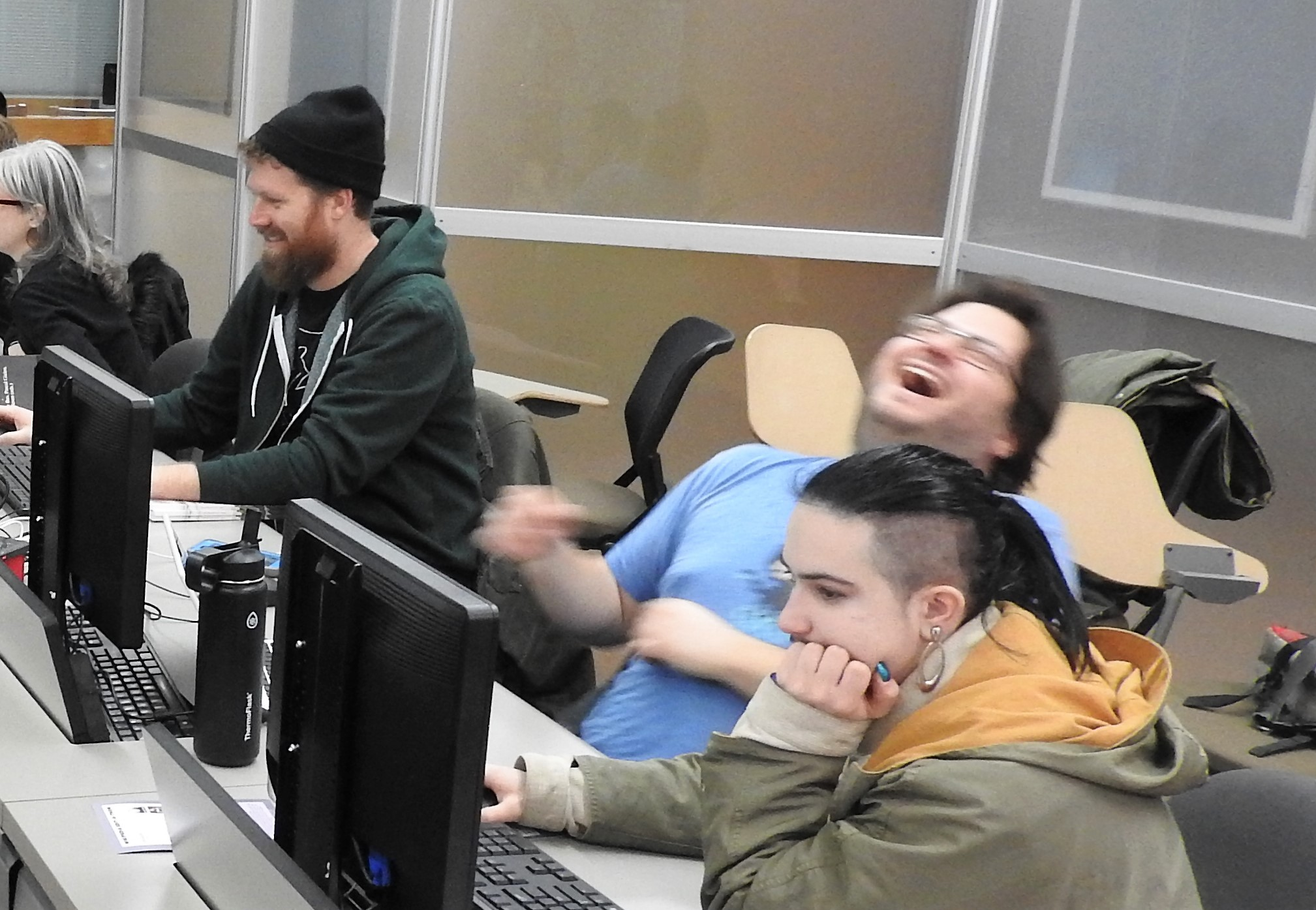
A person literally laughing out loud in a university computer lab

In the early to mid-1980s, Wayne Pearson was reportedly the first person to have used LOL while responding to a friend's joke in a pre-World Wide Web digital chat room called Viewline. Instead of writing "hahaha," as he had done before when he found something humorous, Pearson stated that he instead typed "LOL" to symbolize extreme laughter. Although the account is commonly accepted as true, no written record of the conversation has been found, and the exact date of origin is unknown. The earliest recorded mention of LOL in the contemporary meaning of "Laughing Out Loud" was made in a list of common online acronyms on the May 8, 1989 issue of the electronic newsletter FidoNews, according to the Oxford English Dictionary and linguist Ben Zimmer.

A 2003 study of college students by Naomi Baron found that the use of these initialisms in computer-mediated communication (CMC), specifically in instant messaging, was actually lower than she had expected. The students "used few abbreviations, acronyms, and emoticons". Out of 2,185 transmissions, there were 90 initialisms in total; 76 were occurrences of LOL.

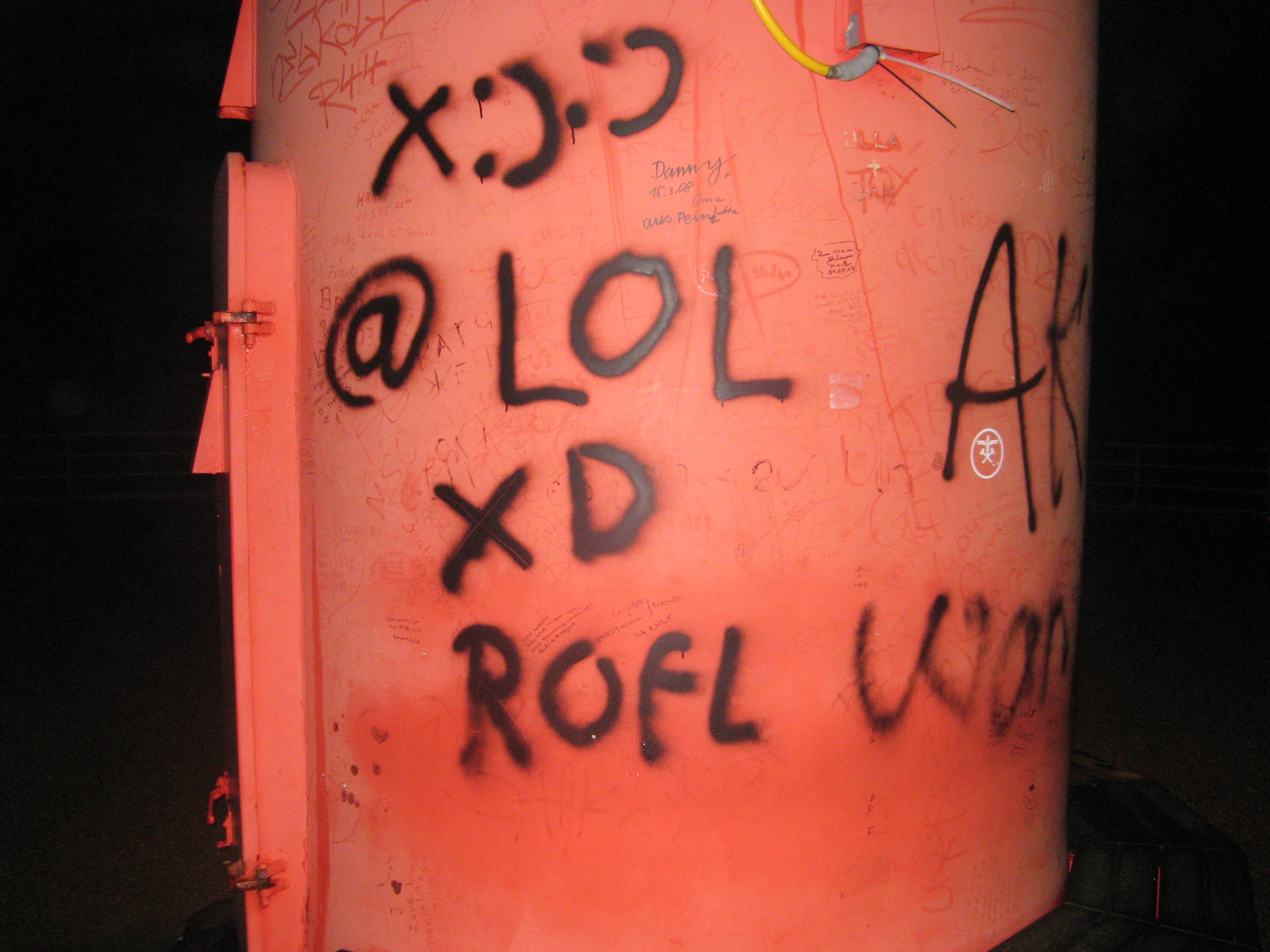
2008 graffiti featuring LOL and ROFL on the Molenfeuer lighthouse in Büsum, Germany

On March 24, 2011, LOL, along with other acronyms, was formally recognized in an update of the Oxford English Dictionary. In their research, it was determined that the earliest recorded use of LOL as an initialism was for "little old lady" in the 1960s.

Gabriella Coleman references "lulz" extensively in her anthropological studies of Anonymous.

LOL, ROFL, and other initialisms have crossed from computer-mediated communication to face-to-face communication. David Crystal – likening the introduction of LOL, ROFL, and others into spoken language in magnitude to the revolution of Johannes Gutenberg's invention of movable type in the 15th century – states that this is "a brand new variety of language evolving", invented by young people within five years, that "extend[s] the range of the language, the expressiveness [and] the richness of the language". However Geoffrey K. Pullum argues that even if interjections such as LOL and ROFL were to become very common in spoken English, their "total effect on language" would be "utterly trivial".

While LOL originally meant "laughing out loud," modern usage is different, and it is commonly used for irony, as an indicator of second meanings, and as a way to soften statements.

== Analysis ==
Silvio Laccetti (professor of humanities at Stevens Institute of Technology) and Scott Molski, in their essay entitled The Lost Art of Writing, are critical of the terms, predicting reduced chances of employment for students who use such slang, stating that, "Unfortunately for these students, their bosses will not 'lol' when they read a report that lacks proper punctuation and grammar, has numerous misspellings, various made-up words, and silly acronyms." Fondiller and Nerone in their style manual assert that smileys and abbreviations are "no more than e-mail slang and have no place in business communication".

Linguist John McWhorter stated, "Lol is being used in a particular way. It's a marker of empathy. It's a marker of accommodation. We linguists call things like that pragmatic particles..." Pragmatic particles are the words and phrases utilized to alleviate the awkward areas in casual conversation, such as oh in "Oh, I don't know" and uh when someone is thinking of something to say. McWhorter stated that lol is utilized less as a reaction to something that is hilarious, but rather as a way to lighten the conversation.

Frank Yunker and Stephen Barry, in a study of online courses and how they can be improved through podcasting, have found that these slang terms, and emoticons as well, are "often misunderstood" by students and are "difficult to decipher" unless their meanings are explained in advance. They single out the example of "ROFL" as not obviously being the abbreviation of "rolling on the floor laughing" (emphasis added). Matt Haig describes the various initialisms of Internet slang as convenient, but warns that "as ever more obscure acronyms emerge they can also be rather confusing". Hossein Bidgoli advises that such initialisms should be used "only when you are sure that the other person knows the meaning" as they "might make comprehension of the message more difficult for the receiver", and differences in meaning may lead to misunderstandings in international contexts.

Tim Shortis observes that ROFL is a means of "annotating text with stage directions". Peter Hershock, in discussing these terms in the context of performative utterances, points out the difference between telling someone that one is laughing out loud and actually laughing out loud: "The latter response is a straightforward action. The former is a self-reflexive representation of an action: I not only do something but also show you that I am doing it. Or indeed, I may not actually laugh out loud but may use the locution 'LOL' to communicate my appreciation of your attempt at humor."

David Crystal notes that use of LOL is not necessarily genuine, just as the use of smiley faces or grins is not necessarily genuine, posing the rhetorical question "How many people are actually 'laughing out loud' when they send LOL?". Louis Franzini concurs, stating that there is as yet no research that has determined the percentage of people who are actually laughing out loud when they write LOL.

Victoria Clarke, in her analysis of telnet talkers, states that capitalization is important when people write LOL, and that "a user who types LOL may well be laughing louder than one who types lol", and opines that "these standard expressions of laughter are losing force through overuse". Michael Egan describes LOL, ROFL, and other initialisms as helpful so long as they are not overused. He recommends against their use in business correspondence because the recipient may not be aware of their meanings, and because in general neither they nor emoticons are in his view appropriate in such correspondence. June Hines Moore shares that view. So, too, does Sheryl Lindsell-Roberts, who gives the same advice of not using them in business correspondence, "or you won't be LOL."

== Variations on the theme ==
=== Variants ===
lul
phonetic spelling of LOL. "LUL" is also commonly used in the gaming community, due to it being an emote on Twitch, which depicts game critic TotalBiscuit laughing.
lolz
Occasionally used in place of LOL.
lulz
Often used to denote laughter at someone who is the victim of a prank, or a reason for performing an action. Its use originated with Internet trolls. According to a New York Times article about Internet trolling, "lulz means the joy of disrupting another's emotional equilibrium." Can be used as a noun – e.g. "do it for the lulz.", shortened into "ftlulz" (to distinguish it from "ftl" – "for the loss"). See also LulzSec.
LOLOLOL...
For added emphasis, LOL can be appended with any number of additional iterations of "OL". In cases such as these, the abbreviation is not to be read literally (i.e., "Laughing out loud out loud out loud out loud"), but is meant to suggest several LOLs in a row.
OMEGALUL / LULW

The OMEGALUL Twitch emote is a distorted image of TotalBiscuit originating c. 2013.

variants of "LUL" used as a Twitch emote.
trolololol / trollololol
A blend of troll and LOL iterated, likely meant to mimick Eduard Khil's 1976 song I Am Very Glad, As I Am Finally Returning Back Home, which became an internet meme in 2010. Indicates that the prank or joke was made by internet trolls, or the user thinks the prank or joke qualifies as internet trolling.

=== Derivations ===
(to) LOL
Used as a verb ("to laugh out loud") and is meant to be conjugated in the appropriate tense. When the past tense is meant, it is written as "LOL(e)d" or "LOL'd".
lolwut / lulwut
lol + wut, used to indicate bemused laughter, or confusion.
lawl, lawlz, lal
Pseudo-pronunciation of LOL. Saying "lawl" is sometimes meant in mockery of those who use the term LOL and is not meant to express laughter.
lel
a "playful or ironic" corruption of LOL. It is sometimes used to mean "laughing extremely loud".
lolcat

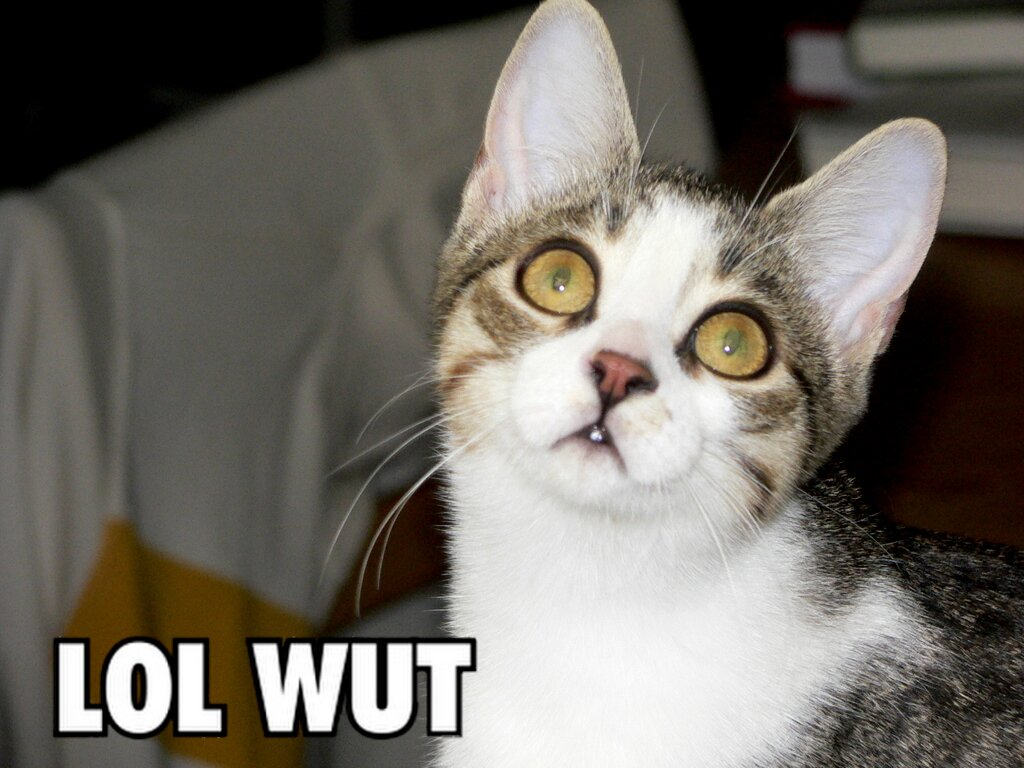
A 2007 lolcat meme, featuring a humorous misspelling of "LOL, what?"

an image macro of a cat

=== Related ===
*G* / *g*
For "grins". Like "lulz" it is used in the initialism "J4G" ("just for grins").
kek
A term for laughter that originated in online games, possibly either World of Warcraft or StarCraft, the latter in which Korean players would type "kekeke" as onomatopoeia for laughter. It later became associated with alt-right politics, in the form of a parody religion surrounding the character Pepe the Frog by analogy with the frog-headed ancient Egyptian god Kek, as well as memes such as Kekistan.
LMAO
For "laughing my arse/ass off". Variants: LMBO ("Laughing my butt off"), LMFAO ("Laughing my fucking ass off").
lqtm
For "Laughing quietly to myself".
ROFL
For "rolling on the floor laughing". It is often combined with LMAO for added emphasis as ROFLMAO ("Rolling on the floor laughing my ass off") or ROFLMFAO ("Rolling on the floor laughing my fucking ass off").
roflcopter

An animated ASCII art image popularized in 2004 by memes using the word "roflcopter"

A portmanteau of ROFL and helicopter. A popular glitch in the Microsoft Sam text-to-speech engine enables the voice to make a sound akin to the rotation of rotor blades when 'SOI' or 'SOY' is entered, and the phrase 'My ROFLcopter goes soi soi soi..." is often associated with the term as a result.
PMSL
For "pissing myself laughing".
IJBOL
For "I just burst out laughing". Gaining popularity among Gen Z, initially popularized within the K-pop fandom. Not derived from Korean.
XD
Sometimes stylized as xD, xd, or Xd, this is an emoticon commonly used to symbolize extreme laughter or happiness.

=== Commonly used equivalents in other languages ===
555
the Thai variation of LOL. "5" in Thai is pronounced "ha", three of them being "hahaha" (ห้า ห้า ห้า).
asg
Swedish abbreviation of the term asgarv, meaning intense laughter.
g
Danish abbreviation of the word griner, which means "laughing" in Danish.
hi hi

The continuous radio Morse message "hi hi hi ..." by the first private satellites called OSCAR, beginning with OSCAR 1 in 1961 (recording from OSCAR 2, 1962)

Pre-dating the Internet and phone texting by a century, the way to express laughter in morse code is "hi hi". The sound of this in morse ('di-di-di-dit di-dit, di-di-di-dit di-dit') is thought to represent chuckling.
jajajá
in Spanish, the letter "j" is pronounced /x/.
jejeje
in the Philippines is used to represent "hehehe". "j" in Filipino languages is pronounced as /h/, derived from the Spanish /x/. Its origins can be traced to SMS language. It is widely used in a Filipino youth subculture known as Jejemons.
mdr
Esperanto version, from the initials of multe da ridoj, which translates to "lot of laughs" in English.
mdr
French version, from the initials of "mort de rire" which roughly translated means "died of laughter", although many French people also use LOL instead as it is the most widely used on the internet.
mkm
in Afghanistan "mkm" (being an abbreviation of the phrase "ma khanda mikonom"). This is a Dari phrase that means "I am laughing".
ptdr
French variant from pété de rire – literally meaning "broken with laughter"
rs
in Brazil "rs" (being an abbreviation of "risos", the plural of "laugh") is often used in text based communications in situations where in English LOL would be used, repeating it ("rsrsrsrsrs") is often done to express longer laughter or laughing harder. Also popular is "kkk" (which can also be repeated indefinitely), due to the pronunciation of the letter k in Brazilian Portuguese sounding similar to the ca in card, and therefore representing the laugh "cacacacaca" (also similar to the Hebrew version below).
חחח/ההה
Hebrew version of LOL. The letter ח is pronounced [/x/ /x/] and ה is pronounced [/h/ /h/]. Putting them together (usually three or more in a row) makes the word khakhakha or hahaha (since vowels in Hebrew are generally not written), which is in many languages regarded as the sound of laughter.
ㅋㅋㅋ/ㅎㅎㅎ
Transliterated respectievly as "kkk" or "kekeke" and "hhh", these are usually used to indicate laughter in Korean. 'ㅋ', is a Korean Jamo consonant representing a "k" sound, and 'ㅎ' represents an "h" sound. Both "ㅋㅋㅋ" and "ㅎㅎㅎ" represent laughter which is not very loud. However, if a vowel symbol is written, louder laughter is implied: 하하 "haha" 호호, "hoho."
wkwkwk
in Indonesian is used in the same way as lol. Early-2000s online-game and chat culture popularized it because alternating W and K is quick to type; some guides explicitly trace it to gaming chats and Indonesian SMS/keyboard habits with "w" representing the slang for gue, which means "me" and "K" meaning ketawa, which means "laugh". It is also a onomatopoeia.
(笑)
in Japanese, the kanji for laugh, is used in the same way as lol. It can be read as kakko warai (literally "parentheses laugh") or just wara. w is also used as an abbreviation, and it is common for multiple w to be chained together. The resulting shape formed from multiple wwwww leads to the usage of 草 (草 meaning 'grass', read as kusa) due to its resemblance to the shape of grass.

== See also ==
- Face with Tears of Joy emoji (😂)
- Internet meme
- Leet
