= LOLwork =

- Ben Huh, William "Will" Sharick and Todd Sawicki (from left)
- Genre: Reality
- Starring: Ben Huh
- Country of origin: United States
- Original language: English
- No. of seasons: 1
- No. of episodes: 6

Production
- Executive producers: Jay Blumenfield; Tom Forman; Tony Marsh
- Running time: 20 to 23 minutes
- Production companies: The Jay and Tony Show; RelativityREAL

Original release
- Network: Bravo
- Release: November 7 – December 12, 2012

LOLwork is an American reality television series on the Bravo. The series premiered on November 7, 2012.

== Premise ==
The series follows Ben Huh and his staff at Cheezburger, located in downtown Seattle, as they create a new comedic web series for their site.

== Cast ==
Sarah Hiraki, Paul Gude, Tori Wadzita, Ben Huh, Forest Gibson, Alison "Ali" Luhrs, Emily Huh, William "Will" Sharick, Alison Monda and Todd Sawicki (from left)

- Alison 'Ali' Luhrs
- Alison 'Monda'
- Ben Huh
- Emily Huh
- Forest Gibson
- Paul Gude
- Todd Sawicki
- Sarah Hiraki
- Tori Wadzita
- William 'Will' Sharick

== Episodes ==
No.	Title	Original release date
1	"The Show Must Go On!"	November 7, 2012
2	"Career Day"	November 14, 2012
3	"Cheez Olympics"	November 21, 2012
4	"Coffee Is for Closers"	November 28, 2012
5	"We're Live in 3...2...1"	December 5, 2012
6	"Lesbian Cat Wedding"	December 13, 2012
Note: This episode aired at 1:33 am instead of its usual 11 pm time slot.
