= Ben Huh =

South Korean-American businessman

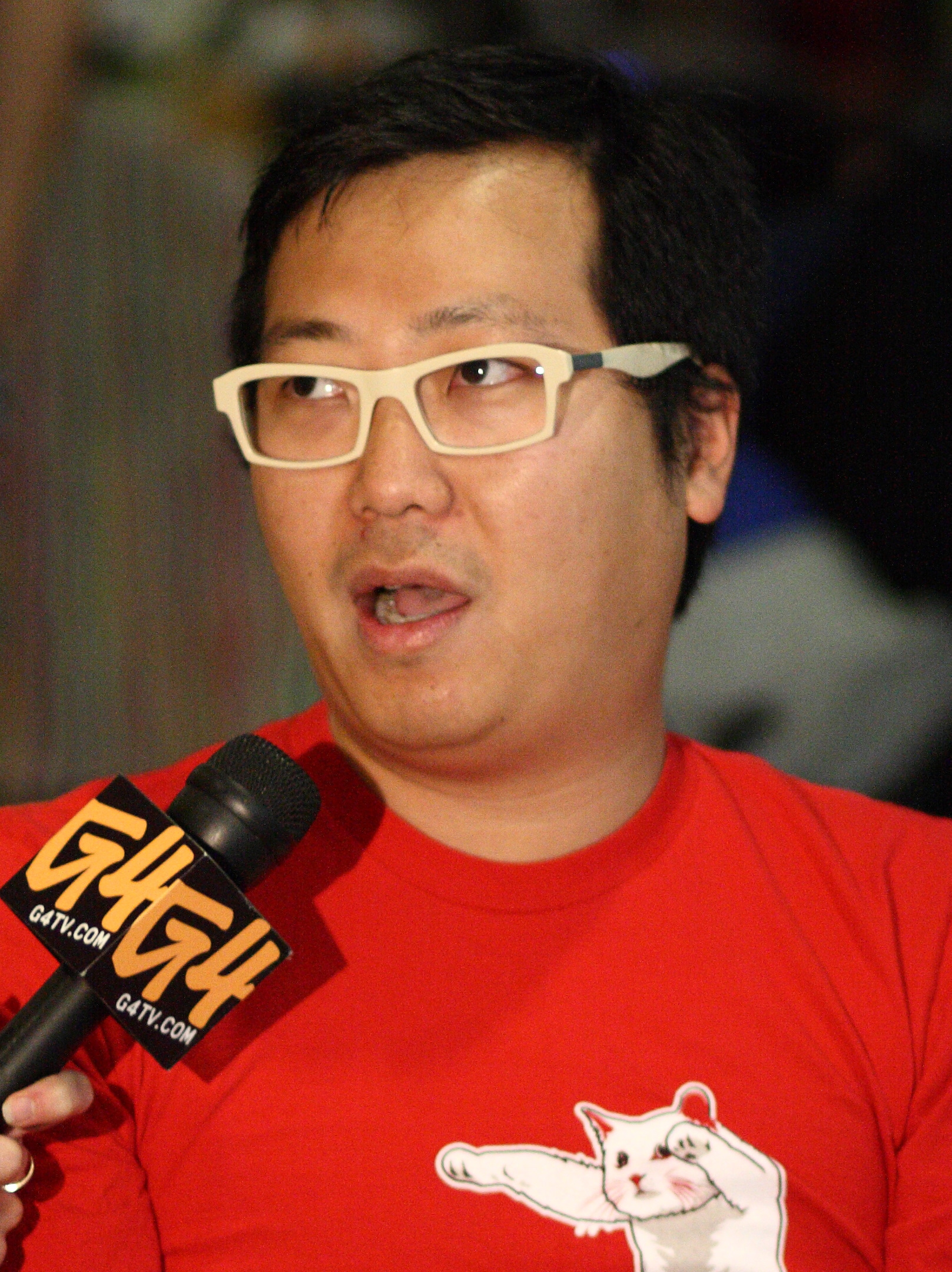
- Huh in 2010
- Born: Seoul, South Korea
- Education: Cordova High School; Northwestern University
- Occupation: CEO of Cheezburger
- Website: Cheezburger.com

Ben Huh is a South Korean and American internet entrepreneur and the former CEO of The Cheezburger Network, which at its peak in 2010 received 375 million views a month across its 50 sites.

== Early life ==
Huh was born in Seoul, South Korea and grew up in Rancho Cordova, California, attending Cordova High School there. In 1999, Huh graduated from Northwestern University with a degree in journalism, although English was not his first language. With regards to this, he said "I got a degree in a language I didn't speak because I felt something in the power of media that attracted me."

The Web's influence on journalism was growing, and Huh decided to go into a career in the Internet. He founded a web analytics company, which folded after 18 months. After that, he worked at three companies in six years.

In 2007, Huh started a blog for fun with his wife about living with a dog in Seattle. Later that year, there was a series of pet food recalls, and the company responsible took down their company website. Huh went through the company's cached files and found a PDF that outlined the company's customers, revenues, and facility locations. He posted this to his blog, and the post got linked around the internet. One of the links was from a site called I Can Has Cheezburger and Huh struck up a friendship with the two owners.

== The Cheezburger Network ==
In September 2007, Huh connected with a group of angel investors to buy I Can Has Cheezburger. At the time, the site was getting viewed 500,000 times daily, which Huh notes was "fantastic for a cat picture site that nobody understood." He likes to joke that his investor pitch was "I would like to start a media company by buying a cat picture website. Can you give me $2.25 million?" Huh states that "we felt like that there was a pretty good possibility that we were buying into a cultural phenomenon, a shift in the way people perceived entertainment."

In 2011, Cheezburger received 375 million page views a month in 2011 across its 50 sites, including I Can Has Cheezburger, FAIL Blog, The Daily What, Know Your Meme, and Memebase. At this time in the site's history, the content was user-generated, with users allowed to upload images and add text captions throughout its network of sites, with the best then being culled by Cheezburger employees and users and posted to the front pages daily. Although Huh does not reveal financial specifics, Wired speculated that the network makes $4 million in yearly revenue, which comes mainly from display ads, books, and merchandise. The Cheezburger Network raised $30 million in venture funding in January 2011, and at that time, employed 75 people and has been profitable since its first quarter. They've released five books, two of which are New York Times bestsellers.

In 2012, Huh announced he was taking on a new project called Circa that wants to "reimagine the way you consume news." In April 2012, Circa raised $750K in Series A funding, before being shut down in 2015 and subsequently reopened under different ownership.

In July 2013, Huh told the media that his decision to make 24 job cuts at Cheezburger, amounting to a third of the firm's employees, was one of the most difficult weeks he had ever experienced.

Huh ran Cheezburger until its acquisition by Literally Media in 2016. The sites no longer rely on user-submitted or user-generated content and are instead maintained by a full editorial team that creates fresh content and articles largely centered on the internet and meme culture.

== Social Construct ==
Huh founded Social Construct, a technology company that assembled "buildings with software-generated floor plans and rooms that fit together like Lego bricks." The company was founded in 2017 from the New Cities moonshot project at Y Combinator, where Huh worked after leaving The Cheezburger Network. The company raised $17M from Y Combinator and Founders Fund and broke ground on a multi-family building in Oakland, CA before shutting down during the COVID-19 pandemic in 2021.

== Orange DAO ==
Huh then went on to co-lead Orange DAO, a decentralized autonomous organization with a membership of more than 1,000 Y Combinator alumni. Orange DAO seeks to "help startups apply to, and be accepted into Y Combinator, provide them with pre- and post-YC funding, while helping mentor their leadership and recruit talent, and acquire customers" according to its charter. Huh is one of three general partners of the investment firm Orange Fund which works with Orange DAO to make investments in early-stage startups.

== Television ==
Huh is the central figure in the LOLwork reality television series on the Bravo television network. The series follows Ben Huh and his staff at Cheezburger as they create new content for the site.

== Reception ==
Huh has been a speaker at SXSW, Web 2.0 Summit and TEDx Seattle. In 2010, Huh was named to Fast Company's list of the "Most Creative People in Business." He was also named to GQ's list of the "Worst-Dressed Men in Silicon Valley"; in response to this, he challenged GQ to a fashion duel.

== Awards ==
Huh received the Ernst & Young Entrepreneur Of The Year Award in 2011.

== Personal life ==
Huh lives in Seattle, Washington with his wife Emily and poodle mix, Nemo. He also runs The Moby Dick Project, which aims to change how news is presented. He is allergic to cats.
