= I Can Has Cheezburger? =

American blog and meme website

- Website type: Blog
- Owner: Literally Media
- Creators: Co-founder Eric Nakagawa and Kari Unebasami
- Revenue: Advertisements
- Parent: Cheezburger
- Website: icanhas.cheezburger.com
- Launched: January 2007
- Current status: Active

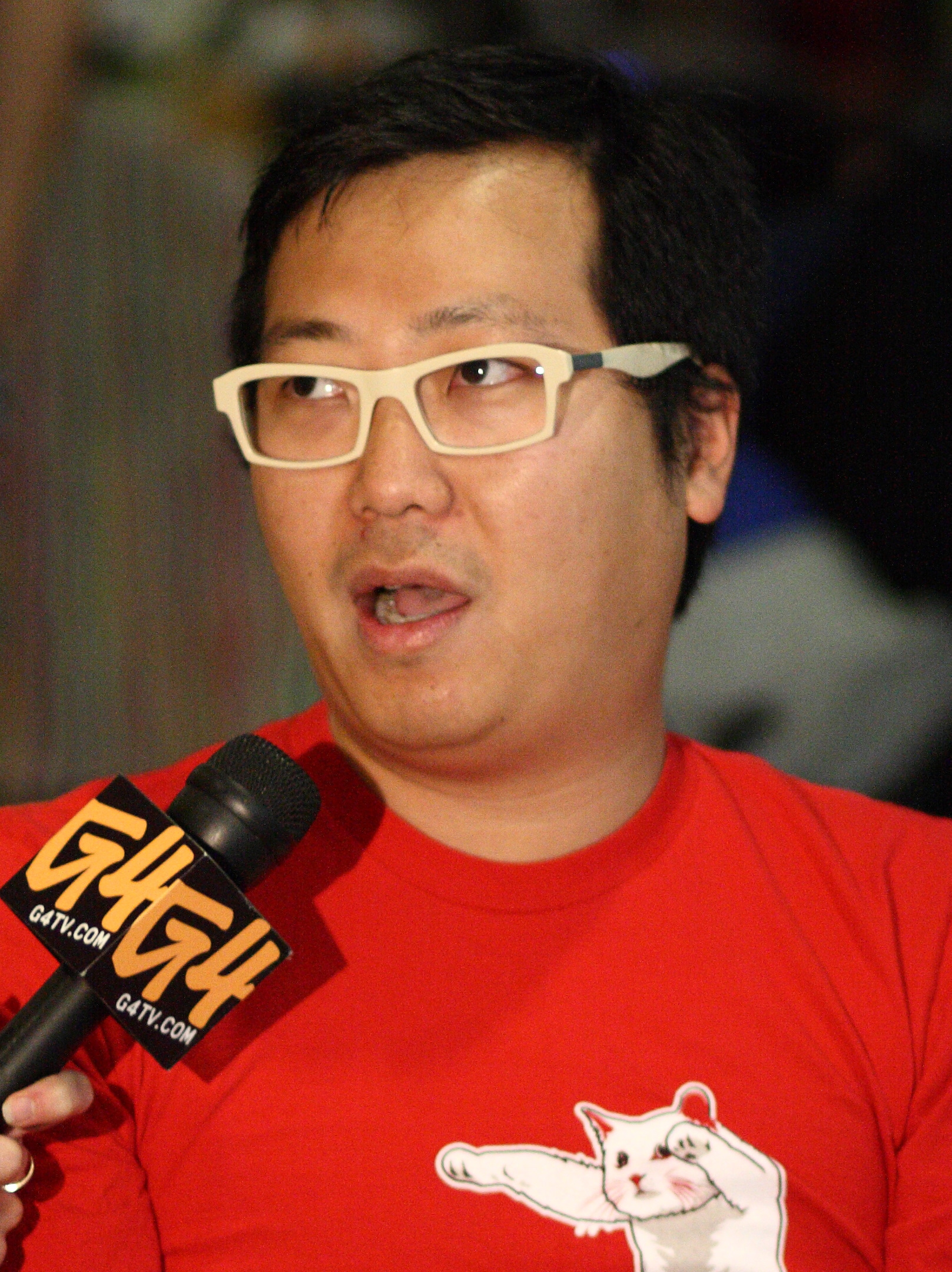
Cheezburger, Inc. former CEO Ben Huh at ROFLCon II in 2010

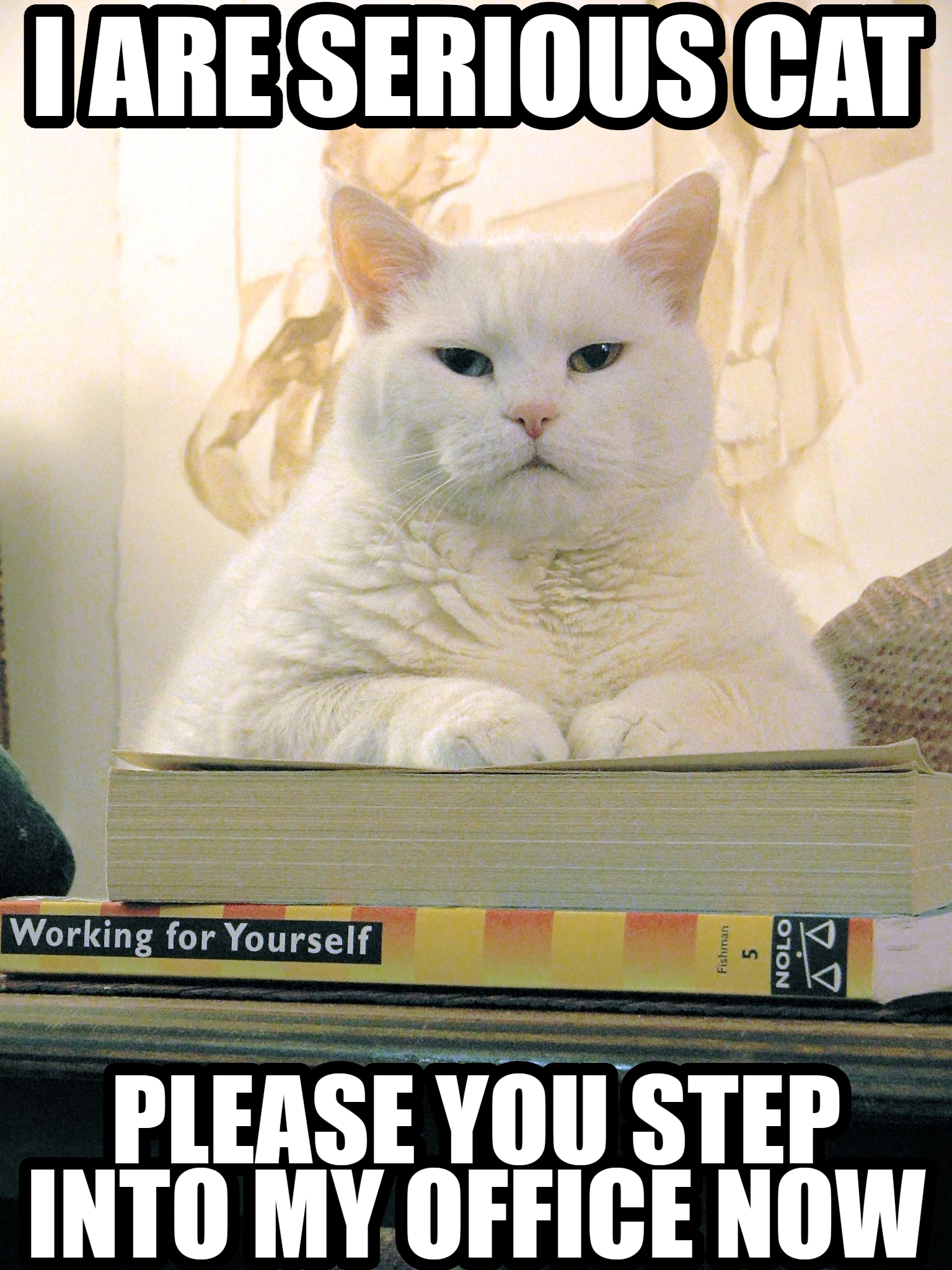
An example of an image that was posted on ICHC

I Can Has Cheezburger? (abbreviated as ICHC) is a blog-format website which features videos and image macros. It was created in 2007 by Eric Nakagawa and Kari Unebasami. It is one of the most popular Internet sites of its kind, receiving up to 1.5 million daily hits at its peak in May 2007. ICHC was instrumental in bringing animal-based image macros and lolspeak into mainstream usage, and in making Internet memes profitable.

ICHC was created on January 11, 2007 when Nakagawa posted an image from comedy website Something Awful of a cat, known as Happycat, with the caption "I can has cheezburger?" Nakagawa continued to post similar images and eventually converted the site to a monetized blog.

A group of investors acquired the blog in September 2007 for US$2 million. It became the flagship site of Cheezburger, led by Ben Huh, which also included FAIL Blog and Know Your Meme. The network was acquired by Literally Media in 2016.

== Content ==
In the early days of the site ICHC's content was submitted by readers using "the LOL Builder", the site's image macro creation tool. In July 2007 ICHC received as many as 500 submissions per day. By January 2008, the average was 8000 though only about a dozen or so submissions per day were posted to the website, while updates were timed to coincide with when readers were most likely to be visiting the site – morning, lunchtime and evenings. As of 2008, ICHC received about 2 million page views per day.

Around 2008, the site attempted to maintain a community feel, encouraging interactivity with readers via a voting system where users could rate an image from one to five "cheezburgers", and through themes, as one image would attract responses to form a continuous narrative. According to Nakagawa when asked about this in 2008, "It's like you're creating a story supplied by people in the community, and then the people in the community supply the next part of the story." Until 2013, ICHC also ran a wiki at SpeakLolSpeak.com designed to be a collection of important lolspeak phrases.

Popular trends on the ICHC website for captioning have included "ceiling cat" (usually a white cat); "basement cat" (a black cat); the "itteh bitteh kitteh committeh"; invisible [something]; the Lolrus and his "bukkit"; fail (now moved to FAIL Blog); "om nom nom" (as in eating sounds); references to "cheezburgers"; "happy caturday"; "monorail kitteh"; "oh hai"; and "kthxbai" ("OK, thanks, goodbye"). ICHC has popularized snowclones such as "I'm in your (noun), (verb ending in ing) your (noun)"; " [some activity or emotion], ur doin it right/wrong"; and "I gave/brought you [something] but I eated it/uzed it all up".

By 2017, the site, along with the rest of the Cheezburger network, no longer relied on user-submitted or user-generated content ("UGC"), instead relying on a full editorial team to create original content.

== Fonts ==
The typeface Impact is used in almost every picture on all the I Can Has Cheezburger websites (though not as much on its subsidiary websites, such as Memebase), and has even gone as far as to be attempted to be replicated in an oil painting representation of the original "Happy cat" (the original lolcat to say "I Can Has Cheezburger?") on the ICHC website. This use of the font stems from it being the font of choice in Something Awful image macros for many hence it is the default font in the site's Lolcat Builder. Many people creating lolcats in other software have used the same font to retain the classic I Can Has Cheezburger look. Other standard fonts are available on the builder.

== Spin-off projects and publications ==
A network of related sister sites developed alongside ICHC followed its success; this grew into Cheezburger, the site for which ICHC is now one of several brands, which also includes Memebase and Fail Blog. The site is maintained by a full editorial team that seeks to deliver fresh, entertaining, and humorous content.

LOLwork on Bravo chronicled employees' live at the ICHC office.

ICHC produced a book, I Can Has Cheezburger?: A LOLcat Colleckshun, in 2008. A second ICHC book, How To Take Over The Wurld: An LOLcat Guide 2 Winning, was published in 2009. Also, FAIL Blog released its first book, Fail Nation: A Visual Romp Through the World of Epic Fails, on October 6, 2009.

Cheezburger was the subject of the LOLwork reality television series on the Bravo television network. The series followed Ben Huh and his staff as they created new content for the site.

#ICanHazPDF, derived from I Can Has Cheezburger?, is a hashtag used on Twitter by researchers seeking academic papers for free to get around academic journals' paywalls.

== See also ==
- Cheezburger
- Fail Blog
- Know Your Meme
- Lolcats
- List of Internet phenomena
- LOLCat Bible Translation Project
- Something Awful
- LOLcats
- Texts From Last Night
