= Lolcat =

Internet meme involving images of cats

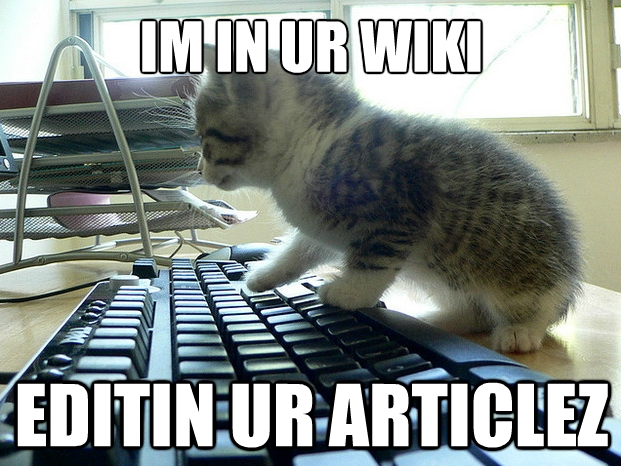
A lolcat meme using the "In ur ..." format, and employing misspellings for humorous effect

A lolcat (pronounced /ˈlɒlkæt/ LOL-kat), or LOLcat, is an image macro of one or more cats. Lolcat images' idiosyncratic and intentionally grammatically incorrect text is known as lolspeak.

Lolcat is a compound word of the acronymic abbreviation LOL (laughing out loud) and the word "cat". A synonym for lolcat is cat macro or cat meme, since the images are a type of image macro and also a well-known genre of Internet meme. Lolcats are commonly designed for photo sharing imageboards and other Internet forums.

== History ==
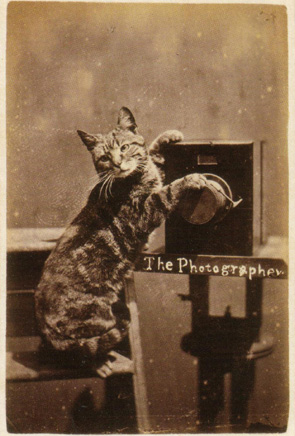
A Brighton Cats carte de visite by Harry Pointer, c. 1870s

British portrait photographer Harry Pointer created a carte de visite series featuring cats posed in various situations in the early 1870s. To these he usually added amusing text intended to further enhance their appeal. These souvenir cards were known as Brighton Cats. Other early figures include Harry Whittier Frees and (using taxidermied animals) Walter Potter.

The first recorded use of the term "lolcat" was used on 4chan, an anonymous imageboard. The word "Lolcat" was in use as early as June 2006; the domain name lolcats.com was registered on June 14, 2006. Their popularity was spread through usage on forums such as Something Awful. The News Journal states that "some trace the lolcats back to the site 4chan, which features bizarre cat pictures on Saturdays, or 'Caturdays'." Ikenburg adds that the images have been "slinking around the Internet for years under various labels, but they did not become a sensation until early 2007 with the advent of I Can Has Cheezburger?" The first image on "I CAN HAS CHEEZBURGER?" was posted on January 11, 2007, and was allegedly from the Something Awful website." Lev Grossman of Time wrote that the oldest known example "probably dates to 2006", but later corrected himself in a blog post where he recanted his statement based on the anecdotal evidence readers had sent him, placing the origin of "Caturday" and many of the images now known by a few as "lolcats" in early 2005. The domain name "caturday.com" was registered on April 30, 2005.

The term lolcat gained national media attention in the United States when it was covered by Time, which wrote that non-commercialized phenomena of the sort are increasingly rare, stating that lolcats have "a distinctly old-school, early 1990s, Usenet feel to [them]". Entertainment Weekly put them on its end-of-the-decade, "best-of" list, saying, "Da cutest distractshun of da decaid? Y, lolcats of corse! We can neber haz enuf of deez capshioned pics of cuddlie kittehs." "Lolcat" was also a runner-up under the "Most Creative" category under the American Dialect Society Word of the Year Awards, losing out to "Googlegänger".

== Format ==
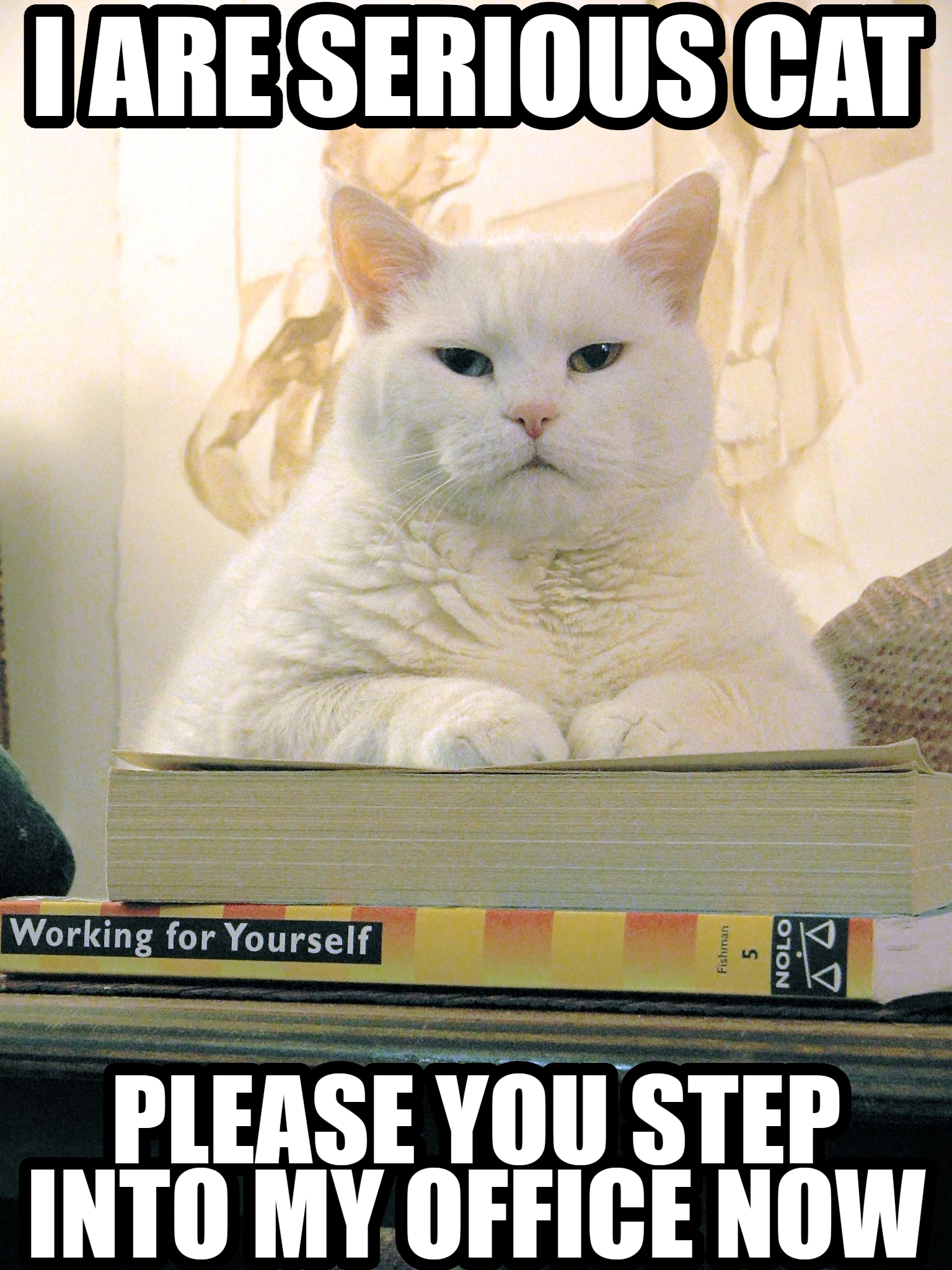
A lolcat image on the icanhascheezburger.com website in 2007

Lolcat is a compound word made from the acronym "LOL" and "cat". Lolcat images comprise a photo of a cat with a large caption characteristically superimposed onto the image in a heavy, sans-serif font such as Impact or Arial Black. Such images and memes following the format are often digitally edited for comedic effect.

Captions act as a speech balloon encompassing a comment from the cat, or as a description of the depicted scene. The caption is intentionally written with deviations from standard English spelling and grammar, featuring "strangely-conjugated verbs, but a tendency to converge to a new set of rules in spelling and grammar".

The text parodies the grammar-poor patois stereotypically attributed to Internet slang. Frequently, lolcat captions take the form of phrasal templates. Some phrases have a known source, usually a well-known Internet meme, such as All your base are belong to us or Do not want, while others do not. The language of lolcats has also been likened to baby talk; however, it draws on a variety of linguistic resources, not just the imitation of baby talk.

Common themes include jokes of the form "Im in ur [noun], [verb]-ing ur [related noun]." Many lolcat images capture cats performing characteristically human actions or appearing to use modern technology, such as computers.

There are several well-known Lolcat images and single-word captions that have spawned many variations and imitations, including "Ceiling Cat" (see below). Others include Fail (a cat with a slice of processed cheese on its face) and "I Can Has Cheezburger" (a portrait of a blue British Shorthair). Another popular format is "[Adjective] cat is [adjective/noun]."

== Recurring characters ==
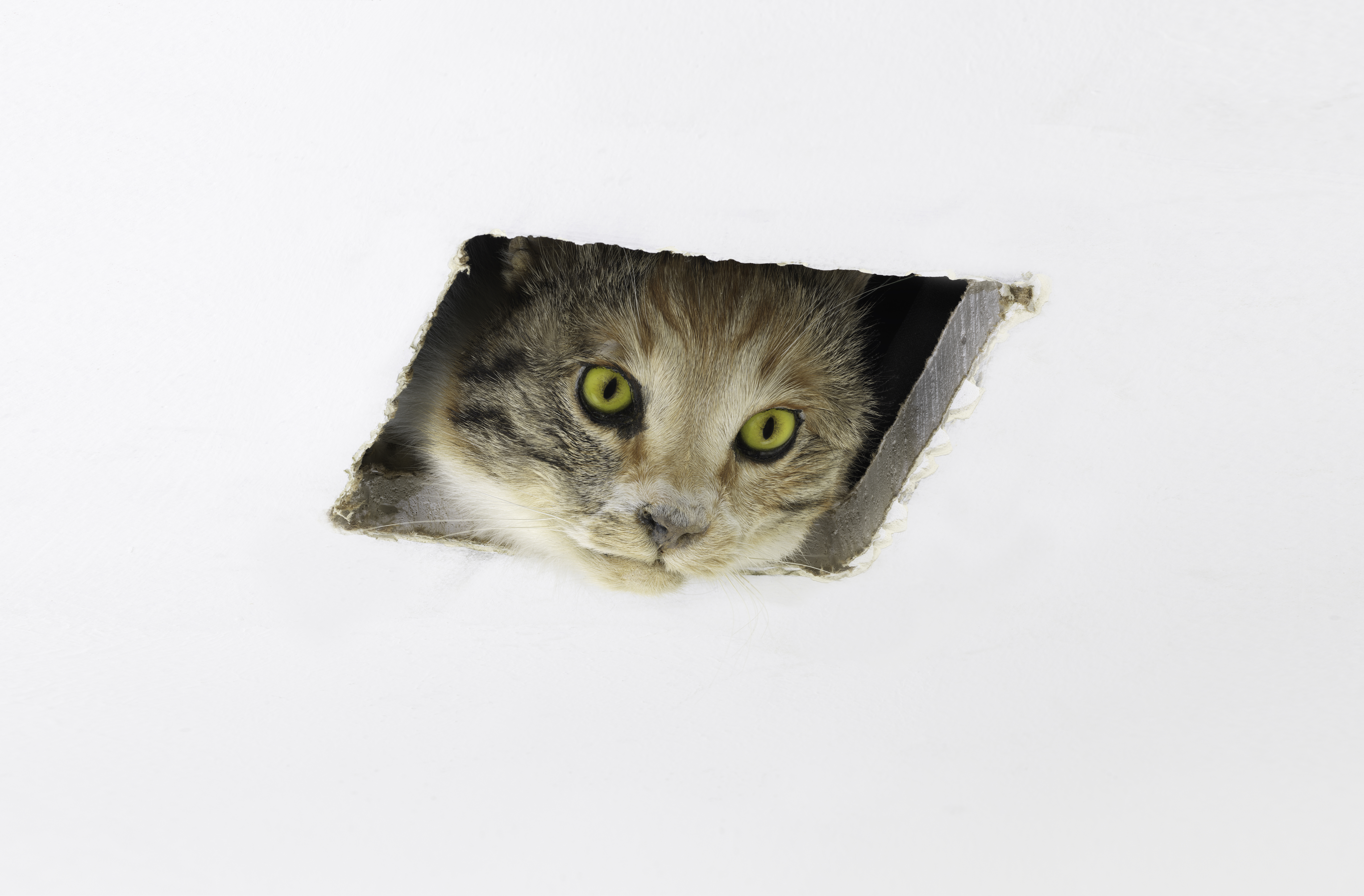
The sculptural recreation of the "Ceiling Cat" meme, created in 2016 by artists Eva & Franco Mattes

"Ceiling Cat" is a character spawned by the meme. The original image was an image macro with a picture of a cat looking out of a hole in a ceiling, captioned "Ceiling Cat is watching you masturbate." There followed numerous examples with the format "Ceiling Cat is watching you [verb ending in / rhyming with -ate]" with Ceiling Cat superimposed in the upper left hand corner of an image macro depicting the appropriate action. The underlying theme is that the cat is looking down on one, almost in a form of judgment.

"Ceiling Cat" and the corresponding "Basement Cat" (a black cat who lives in the basement) are said to represent good and evil in the lolcat universe, and in some cases God and Satan, as in the LOLCat Bible Translation Project. Limecat was also created either around this time or earlier.

Ceiling Cat by Eva & Franco Mattes, a 2016 taxidermy cat installation mimicking the meme, is in the collection of the San Francisco Museum of Modern Art.

== Offshoots and parodies ==
The syntax of lolcat captions was used as the basis for LOLCODE, an esoteric programming language with interpreters and compilers available in .NET Framework, Perl, etc.

lolcat, a variant of the Unix utility cat, outputs text in rainbow colours.

== See also ==
- List of Internet phenomena
- Cats That Look Like Hitler! – a type of LOLcat specifically made to look like Adolf Hitler
- Cute cat theory of digital activism – using lowbrow but popular online subjects for activism
- Catvertising – cats in advertising, especially the parody of commercialization of cat viral videos by st. john
- Grumpy Cat – an Internet celebrity cat who was known for her grumpy facial expression
- I Can Has Cheezburger? – a weblog featuring lolcats
- Laugh-Out-Loud Cats – a comic inspired by lolspeak and other Internet humor
- LOLCat Bible Translation Project – bible translation project to lolspeak
- LOLCODE – an esoteric programming language inspired by lolspeak
