= Internet slang =

Slang terms and languages used on the internet

Internet slang (also known as internet shorthand, cyber-slang, netspeak, or digispeak) is a non-standard or unofficial form of language used by people on the internet to communicate with one another. A popular example of internet slang is "lol", meaning "laughing out loud". Since internet slang is constantly changing, it is difficult to provide a standardized definition. However, it can be understood to be any type of slang that internet users have popularized and, in many cases, have coined. Such terms often originate with the purpose of saving keystrokes or to compensate for character limit restrictions. Many people use the same abbreviations in texting, instant messaging, and social networking websites. Acronyms, keyboard symbols, and abbreviations are common types of internet slang. New dialects of slang, such as leet or lolspeak, develop as ingroup internet memes rather than time savers. Internet slang is also used in face-to-face, real life communication.

== Creation and evolution ==
=== Origins ===
Internet slang originated in the early days of the internet, with some terms predating it. The earliest forms of internet slang assumed people's knowledge of programming and commands in a specific language. Internet slang is used in chat rooms, social networking services, online games, video games and in the online community. Since 1979, users of communications networks like Usenet created their own shorthand. Internet slang originated as a way to save keystrokes for users, alongside getting around auto-moderated platforms. If a platform banned users for typing a specific word, they would create new ones that had a communal understanding of the definition, allowing them to avoid the ban filter.

=== Motivations ===
The primary motivation for using a slang unique to the internet is to ease communication. While internet slang shortcuts save time for the writer, they can also take two times as long for the reader to understand, according to a study by the University of Tasmania. On the other hand, similar to the use of slang in traditional face-to-face speech or written language, slang on the internet is often a way of indicating group membership.

Internet slang provides a channel which facilitates and constrains the ability to communicate in ways that are fundamentally different from those found in other semiotic situations. Many of the expectations and practices which we associate with spoken and written language are no longer applicable. The internet itself is ideal for new slang to emerge because of the richness of the medium and the availability of information. Slang is also thus motivated for the "creation and sustenance of online communities". These communities, in turn, play a role in solidarity or identification or an exclusive or common cause.

David Crystal distinguishes among five areas of the internet where slang is used — The Web itself, email, asynchronous chat (for example, mailing lists), synchronous chat (for example, Internet Relay Chat), and virtual worlds. The electronic character of the channel has a fundamental influence on the language of the medium. Options for communication are constrained by the nature of the hardware needed in order to gain internet access. Thus, productive linguistic capacity (the type of information that can be sent) is determined by the preassigned characters on a keyboard, and receptive linguistic capacity (the type of information that can be seen) is determined by the size and configuration of the screen. Additionally, both sender and receiver are constrained linguistically by the properties of the internet software, computer hardware, and networking hardware linking them. Electronic discourse refers to writing that is "very often reads as if it were being spoken – that is, as if the sender were writing talking".

== Types of slang ==
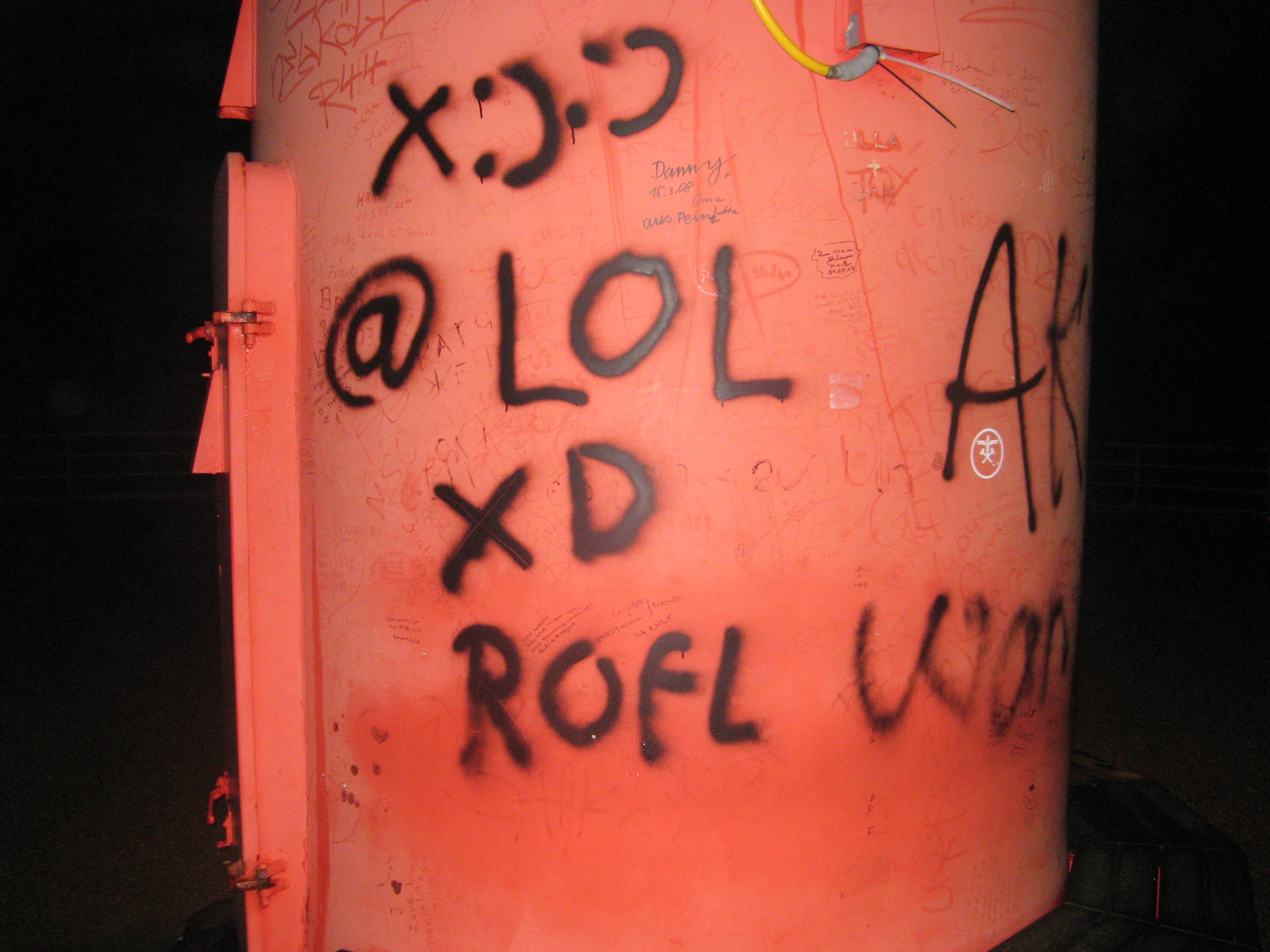
In this picture, the graffiti represents some examples of the different types of slang. The symbols "X:)" ":)" and "XD" are an example of emoticons. LOL "laugh out loud" and ROFL "rolling on the floor laughing" are examples of letter homophones.

Internet slang does not constitute a homogeneous language variety; rather, it differs according to the user and type of internet situation. Audience design occurs in online platforms, and therefore online communities can develop their own sociolects, or shared linguistic norms.

Within the language of internet slang, there is still an element of prescriptivism, as seen in style guides, for example Wired Style, which are specifically aimed at usage on the internet. Even so, few users consciously heed these prescriptive recommendations on CMC (Computer-mediated communication), but rather adapt their styles based on what they encounter online. Although it is difficult to produce a clear definition of internet slang, the following types of slang may be observed. This list is not exhaustive.

Class	Description
Rebuses (Homophones & homographs)	Included within this group are abbreviations and acronyms. An abbreviation is a shortening of a word, for example "CU" or "CYA" for "see you (see ya)". An acronym, on the other hand, is a subset of abbreviations and are formed from the initial components of each word. Examples of common acronyms include "LOL" for "laugh out loud", "BTW" for "by the way" and "TFW" for "that feeling when". There are also combinations of both, like "CUL8R" for "see you later".
Rebuses (Homophones & homographs)	Mostly a puzzle device, but it can be used as internet slang using Unicode characters like emojis or letters. Examples include "Ỽ", Latin letter V shaped like an egg in the Middle Welsh language and "ꙮ", Cyrillic letter Multiocular O shaped like grapes.
Heterographs	Using one word in place of another, different but similarly sounding, word. Alternatively, a deliberate misspelling. For example, using "sauce" instead of "source" when asking for the source of an image or other posted material online. For example, TikTok algorithms monitor 'explicit' content by censoring certain words or promoting videos based on the inclusion of certain hashtags; the intentional misspelling of words bypasses censorship guidelines and subsequently creates a range of platform-specific slang, renders trigger warnings as ineffective and can end up promoting harmful content (e.g. misspelling anorexia, pro-eating disorder content can be featured on the For You page via algorithms that promote popular content).
Punctuation, capitalizations, and other symbols	Such features are commonly used for emphasis. Periods or exclamation marks may be used repeatedly for emphasis, such as "........" or "!!!!!!!!!!". Question marks and exclamation marks are often used together in strings such as "?!?!?!?!" when one is angry while asking a question. Grammatical punctuation rules are also relaxed on the internet. "E-mail" may simply be expressed as "email", and apostrophes can be dropped so that "John's book" becomes "johns book". Examples of capitalizations include "STOP IT", which can convey a stronger emotion of annoyance as opposed to "stop it". Alternating capitalizations can be used in a mocking or ironic tone, mimicking a form of emotional prosody. Bold, underline and italics are also used to indicate stress. Using a tilde ~ can be a symbol of sarcasm, like "~That was so funny ~". The period can also be used in a way to symbolize seriousness, or anger like "ok."
Onomatopoeic or stylized spellings	Onomatopoeic spellings have also become popularized on the internet. One well-known example is "hahaha" to indicate laughter. Onomatopoeic spellings are very language-specific. For instance, in Spanish, laughter is spelled as "jajaja" instead because J is pronounced as /h/ (like English "h" in "hahaha") in Spanish. In Thai, it is "55555" because 5 in Thai ("ห้า") is pronounced /haː˥˩/.
Keyboard-generated emoticons and smileys	Emoticons are generally found in web forums, instant messengers, and online games. They are culture-specific and certain emoticons are only found in some languages but not in others. For example, the Japanese equivalent of emoticons, kaomoji (literally "face marks"), focus on the eyes instead of the mouth as in Western emoticons. They are also meant to be read right-side up, as in ^_^ as opposed to sideways, :3. Kaomoji are used to convey a wide range of statements about the tone of an accompanying message, such as seeking to soften a message that may otherwise be read as overly strict or formal. More recently than face emoticons, other emoticon symbols such as <3 (which is a sideways heart) have emerged.
Emojis	Emojis are relatively new to internet slang, and are much like emoticons in the way that they visually convey messages. However, while emoticons create an image using characters from the keyboard, emojis are a whole new level of communication and slang that portray messages in small cartoons. With culture comes different meanings for different emojis. For example, in 2016, Emojipedia and Prismoji took 571 peach emoji tweets and associated them with six different meanings varying from the fruit, feeling peachy, or sexual connotations.
Leet	Leetspeak, or 1337, is an alternative alphabet for the English language which uses various combinations of ASCII characters to replace Latinate letters. For example, Wikipedia may be expressed as "\/\/1|<1p3[)14". It originated from computer hacking, but its use has been extended to online gaming as well. Leet is often used today to set up effective security passwords for different accounts. Leet is also used on social media platforms that employ content control algorithms to censor topics that may be controversial or inappropriate; using leet for potentially problematic terms (e.g. "k1ll"; "s3x"; "ant1s3m1t1sm") can avoid censorship.
Novel syntactic features	Unusual syntactic structures such as "I Can Has Cheezburger?" and "You are doing me a frighten" have been encouraged and spread by highly successful memes. Pluralization of "the internets" is another example, which has become common since it was used by George W. Bush during a televised event.

== Views ==
Many debates about how the use of slang on the internet influences language outside of the digital sphere go on. Even though the direct causal relationship between the internet and language has yet to be proven by any scientific research, internet slang has invited split views on its influence on the standard of language use in non-computer-mediated communications.

Prescriptivists tend to have the widespread belief that the internet has a negative influence on the future of language, and that it could lead to a degradation of standard. Some would even attribute any decline of standard formal English to the increase in usage of electronic communication. It has also been suggested that the linguistic differences between Standard English and CMC can have implications for literacy education. This is illustrated by the widely reported example of a school essay submitted by a Scottish teenager, which contained many abbreviations and acronyms likened to SMS language. There was great condemnation of this style by the mass media as well as educationists, who expressed that this showed diminishing literacy or linguistic abilities.

On the other hand, descriptivists have counter-argued that the internet allows better expressions of a language. Rather than established linguistic conventions, linguistic choices sometimes reflect personal taste. It has also been suggested that as opposed to intentionally flouting language conventions, internet slang is a result of a lack of motivation to monitor speech online. Hale and Scanlon describe language in emails as being derived from "writing the way people talk", and that there is no need to insist on 'Standard' English. English users, in particular, have an extensive tradition of etiquette guides, instead of traditional prescriptive treatises, that offer pointers on linguistic appropriateness. Using and spreading internet slang also adds onto the cultural currency of a language. It is important to the speakers of the language due to the foundation it provides for identifying within a group, and also for defining a person's individual linguistic and communicative competence. The result is a specialized subculture based on its use of slang.

In the workspace, internet slang and abbreviations are becoming more acceptable. People are resonating with each other when they see a quickly jotted down message with lots of contractions and slang added in. As long as 'Sent from my iPhone' appears at the bottom of an email, most people are willing to look the other way when it comes to formal grammar.

In American schools, internet slang has started to become more common in a real-life setting. The '6-7' trend spread to most middle schools in America, and began to be spoken in person. '6-7,' slang initially derived from the internet, made its way into the classroom. Although '6-7' is now in decline, it still offers an interesting look into how internet slang can cross over into common conversation.

Internet slang has borrowed heavily from African-American Vernacular English (AAVE), which is often seen as an example of cultural appropriation.

In scholarly research, attention has been drawn to the effect of the use of internet slang in ethnography, and more importantly to how conversational relationships online change structurally because slang is used.

In German, there is already considerable controversy regarding the use of anglicisms outside of CMC. This situation is even more problematic within CMC, since the jargon of the medium is dominated by English terms. An extreme example of an anti-anglicism perspective can be observed from the chatroom rules of a Christian site, which bans all anglicisms ("Das Verwenden von Anglizismen ist strengstens untersagt!" [Using anglicisms is strictly prohibited!]), and also translates even fundamental terms into German equivalents.

=== Journalism ===
In April 2014, Gawker's editor-in-chief Max Read instituted new writing style guidelines banning internet slang for his writing staff. Internet slang has gained attraction, however in other publications ranging from BuzzFeed to The Washington Post, gaining attention from younger viewers. Clickbait headlines have particularly sparked attention, originating from the rise of BuzzFeed in the journalistic sphere which ultimately led to an online landscape populated with social media references and a shift in language use.

Beyond the clickbait, internet slang is now used in modern news articles. After Faker, a professional League of Legends player, won the 2025 League of Legends world championship and his sixth championship total, The New York Times' Athletic wrote about him. In the title they reference Faker as the 'GOAT' of League, a commonly used term in internet slang.

The scene of journalism as a whole has become increasingly interested in internet slang over the past few years. The New York Times has published many articles covering internet slang, or as they refer to much of it, 'Gen Alpha' slang. Journalists are interested in explaining the lexicon of the youth, helping older generations better understand what their children are talking about. One Times article alone covers over 10 different words of internet slang, ranging from terms like 'gyat' to what a 'rizzler' is. Two years later, the Time published yet another article, explaining more of the Gen Z and Gen Alpha vernacular. This article spent less time explaining multiple terms and instead focused in on a specific one: 'chopped.' As internet slang becomes more ubiquitous in the modern era, journalists are looking to keep people informed on the changing ways that people are communicating.

== Use beyond computer-mediated communication ==
Internet slang has crossed from being mediated by the computer into other non-physical domains. Here, these domains are taken to refer to any domain of interaction where interlocutors need not be geographically proximate to one another, and where the internet is not primarily used. Internet slang is now prevalent in telephony, mainly through short messages (SMS) communication. Abbreviations and interjections, especially, have been popularized in this medium, perhaps due to the limited character space for writing messages on mobile phones. Another possible reason for this spread is the convenience of transferring the existing mappings between expression and meaning into a similar space of interaction.

At the same time, internet slang has also taken a place as part of everyday offline language, among those with digital access. The nature and content of online conversation is brought forward to direct offline communication through the telephone and direct talking, as well as through written language, such as in writing notes or letters. In the case of interjections, such as numerically based and abbreviated internet slang, they are not pronounced as they are written physically or replaced by any actual action. Rather, they become lexicalized and spoken like non-slang words in a "stage direction" like fashion, where the actual action is not carried out but substituted with a verbal signal. The notions of flaming and trolling have also extended outside the computer, and are used in the same circumstances of deliberate or unintentional implicatures.

The expansion of internet slang has been furthered through codification and the promotion of digital literacy. The subsequently existing and growing popularity of such references among those online as well as offline has thus advanced internet slang literacy and globalized it. Awareness and proficiency in manipulating internet slang in both online and offline communication indicates digital literacy and teaching materials have even been developed to further this knowledge. A South Korean publisher, for example, has published a textbook that details the meaning and context of use for common internet slang instances and is targeted at young children who will soon be using the internet. Similarly, internet slang has been recommended as language teaching material in second language classrooms in order to raise communicative competence by imparting some of the cultural value attached to a language that is available only in slang.

Meanwhile, well-known dictionaries such as the ODE and Merriam-Webster have been updated with a significant and growing body of slang jargon. Besides common examples, lesser-known slang and slang with a non-English etymology have also found a place in standardized linguistic references. Along with these instances, literature in user-contributed dictionaries such as Urban Dictionary has also been added. Codification seems to be qualified through frequency of use, and novel creations are often not accepted by other users of slang. In the past few years, internet slang has been seeing a massive rise in acceptance from dictionaries on the web. Dictionary.com's word of the year for 2025 was the term '67,' a piece of internet slang largely used by Gen Alpha on TikTok, and now, real life.

=== Politics ===
In recent years, politicians have begun using internet slang in their campaigns. In the 2025 New York City Mayoral race, Curtis Sliwa, the Republican nominee, used the term 'glazing' in a debate with Zohran Mamdani and Andrew Cuomo. Sliwa ended up receiving 7% of the overall vote. On the other hand, Mamdani used a largely online platform, featuring many Instagram Reels to convey information to his target audience. He catered to Gen Z and Millennials by taking to the internet and proving he was one of them by using his own variants of internet slang.

A study showed that online, most people are interacting with political news utilizing slang. In comment sections of news article, sub dialects of internet slang are being created, solely based around politics and current movements. The study also found that depending on the news site being commented on, slang differences would heavily vary. Internet slang used on The New York Times site would be incredibly different from that seen on Breitbart.

=== Present ===
Although internet slang began as a means of "opposition" to mainstream language, its popularity with today's globalized digitally literate population has shifted it into a part of everyday language, where it also leaves a profound impact. 6–7, a meme that grew to fame in 2025 is an example. It is a term that does not have a true meaning to it, but was developed and catalysed on the internet as slang. The term grew so big that Dictionary.com labeled it as their 'Word of the Year' for 2025. They stated that its large usage by Generation Alpha in a real-world context earned it the number one spot. Its influence reached beyond that of the computer screen, changing how kids interact with their parents, teachers, and friends. Other terms like 'rizz' have seen massive use in modern-day life, all while they originated from online figures such as Kai Cenat.

Frequently used slang also have become conventionalised into memetic "unit[s] of cultural information". These memes in turn are further spread through their use on the internet, prominently through websites. The internet as an "information superhighway" is also catalysed through slang. The evolution of slang has also created a 'slang union' as part of a unique, specialised subculture. Such impacts are, however, limited and require further discussion especially from the non-English world. This is because internet slang is prevalent in languages more actively used on the internet, like English, which is the internet's lingua franca.

== Global usage ==
Chinese seal carving work. The character is a combination of three characters, which is done by a Chinese netizen. This is a satire of Chinese internet censorship. (See Grass Mud Horse.)

Aside from the more frequent abbreviations, acronyms, and emoticons, internet slang also uses archaic words or the lesser-known meanings of mainstream terms. Regular words can also be remixed into something with a similar pronunciation but altogether different meaning, or attributed new meanings altogether. Phonetic transcriptions are the transformation of words to how it sounds in a certain language, and are used as internet slang. In places where logographic languages are used, such as China, a visual internet slang exists, giving characters dual meanings, one direct and one implied.

The internet has allowed for global connectivity and the forming of relationships across countries. In addition, languages other than English are growing online, following the increase in internet usage in predominantly non-English speaking countries. As of January 2020, only approximately 25.9% of the online population is made up of English speakers.

Motivations for use of slang and its use differ by culture. In China, users may adopt slang as a method of discussing issues that are deemed sensitive by the government. These include using symbols to separate the characters of a word to avoid detection from manual or automated text pattern scanning and consequential censorship. An outstanding example is the use of the term river crab to denote censorship. River crab (hexie) is pronounced the same as "harmony"—the official term used to justify political discipline and censorship. As such Chinese netizens reappropriate the official terms in a sarcastic way.

Abbreviations are popular across different cultures, including countries like Japan, China, France, Portugal, etc., and are used according to the particular language the internet users speak. Significantly, this same style of slang creation is also found in non-alphabetical languages as, for example, a form of "e gao" or alternative political discourse.

The difference in language often results in miscommunication, as seen in an onomatopoeic example, "555", which sounds like "crying" in Chinese, and "laughing" in Thai. A similar example is between the English "haha" and the Spanish "jaja", where both are onomatopoeic expressions of laughter, but the difference in language also meant a different consonant for the same sound to be produced. For more examples of how other languages express "laughing out loud", see also: LOL

In terms of culture, in Chinese, the numerically based onomatopoeia "770880" (simplified Chinese: 亲亲你抱抱你; traditional Chinese: 親親你抱抱你; pinyin: qīn qīn nǐ bào bào nǐ), which means to 'kiss and hug you', is used. This is comparable to "XOXO", which many internet users use. In French, "pk" or "pq" is used in the place of pourquoi, which means 'why'. This is an example of a combination of onomatopoeia and shortening of the original word for convenience when writing online.

Popular use of internet slang has both created and been caused by online and offline communities. Some virtual communities can be marked by the specific slang they use and led to a more homogenized yet diverse online culture.

== Internet slang in advertisements ==
Internet slang can make advertisements more effective. Through two empirical studies, it was proven that internet slang could help promote or capture the crowd's attention through advertisement, but did not increase the sales of the product. However, using internet slang in advertisement may attract a certain demographic, and might not be the best to use depending on the product or goods. Furthermore, an overuse of internet slang also negatively affects the brand due to the quality of the advertisement, but using an appropriate amount would be sufficient in providing more attention to the ad. According to the experiment, internet slang helped capture the attention of the consumers of necessity items. However, the demographic of luxury goods differ, and using internet slang would potentially have the brand lose credibility due to the appropriateness of internet slang.

Another study found that what type of slang was used altered how customers perceived a brand. Brands that used amiable slang were more likely to be perceived by consumers as sincere, whereas harsher slang would make consumers feel the brand is more competent. The experiment was conducted entirely in China, sampling only that portion of the world's internet user base.

Companies that cater largely to younger demographics have been embracing internet slang as a large portion of their marketing. In December 2025, Fortnite: Battle Royale launched its seventh chapter of the game. To advertise this transition, the company utilized the slang of '67' to better engage with a younger audience. Epic Games, the parent company of Fortnite, have begun using material like this in their marketing more and more. They have also started using basic meme templates, including internet slang within them, to further their connection with Generation Alpha.

Another example would be that of 'Monopoly GO,' a game that also caters heavily to a younger audience. This advertisement includes tons of comments with internet slang, helping to gain trust with those watching as it makes them seem to be part of the community that they are advertising to.

== See also ==
- African-American Vernacular English (AAVE) – Variety of American English
- Algospeak – Obfuscated speech on social media
- Cyberculture – Culture that has emerged from the use of computer networks
- Internet industry jargon – Jargon used by workers in the Internet industry
- English-language spelling reform – Proposals to phoneticise English spelling
- Internet linguistics – Domain of linguistics
- Internet meme – Cultural item spread via the internet
- Internet minute
- Jargon File – Collection of definitions from computer subcultures
- Languages used on the Internet
- Lists of acronyms
- Glossary of Generation Z slang
- Netiquette – Code of behavior for use of the Internet
- Roman and medieval abbreviations used to save space on manuscripts and epigraphs:
  - Scribal abbreviations – Abbreviations used by ancient and medieval scribes
  - Tironian notes – Roman shorthand system
  - Typographic ligature – Glyph combining two or more letterforms
- SMS language – Abbreviated slang used in text messaging
- TL;DR – "too long; didn't read"; Internet comment
