= Internet Cat Video Festival =

Cat video competition

The Internet Cat Video Festival was an American competition that showcased cat videos from the internet. Many of these festivals included appearances by special guests (such as Grumpy Cat and the creator of Nyan Cat), live music, costume contests, art projects, and booths hosting local animal resource nonprofits. The 2013 Minneapolis show featured a cat sculpture made out of butter.

== From Conception - 2015 ==
The idea for the first Internet Cat Video Festival came from Katie Hill, a program associate at the Walker Art Center in Minneapolis, who suggested it early in 2012 as joke. The Festival quickly became a viral phenomenon, drawing a crowd of more than 10,000 fans to the Walker's Open Field. The event caught the attention of local, national, and international audiences and media including the New York Times. Walker Art Center was joined by community partners Feline Rescue, Animal Humane Society, and The Wildcat Sanctuary.

After the inaugural event, the Internet Cat Video Festival went on tour. Stops included University of Massachusetts Boston, the Museum of Photographic Arts in San Diego, and Memphis Brooks Museum of Art. The festival was also included in Vienna Independent Shorts and the Jerusalem Film Festival.

The next big festival took place in Oakland, California on May 11, 2013. All profits benefitted the East Bay SPCA. On June 21 and 22, 2013, the festival was at Portland, Oregon's Hollywood Theatre in partnership with the Theatre's "Future So Bright" project.

On Saturday, October 19, 2013, the festival was held in Chicago, supported by the Chicago Cat Rescue and Tree House.

Moving into its second year, the festival was booked for 15 tour dates, including festivals in San Francisco, Chicago, Brooklyn, and New York City, plus experimental versions at ArtPrize in Grand Rapids, Michigan, and at CultureTECH in Derry, Northern Ireland. In 2013, the festival returned to Minneapolis and screens at the State Fair Grandstand.

The third Internet Cat Video Film Festival was held at Walker's Open Field on August 14, 2014.

The fourth and final Film Festival took place in 2015. Walker Art Center discontinued the event "to put our resources towards the remodeling of [the] campus including the Minneapolis Sculpture Garden,” according to spokeswoman Rachel Joyce. All of the festival memorabilia was given to the Minnesota Historical Society.

== St. Paul Saints’ Cat Video Festival (2015 - ) ==
Despite no longer being involved with the Walker Art Center, the festival was held annually in the Minneapolis–Saint Paul. After the Walker Center ended its involvement in 2015, the St. Paul Saints and CHS Field adopted and hosted the event.

In 2020, the St. Paul Saints’ Cat Video Festival was held virtually. As of 2021, there were plans to hold it in person again.

== Media ==
The festival used the Twitter hashtag #catvidfest. The first nominations closed July 30, 2012. Katie Hill "watched every single [of the 10,000 submissions], eventually boiling them down into 65 minutes of concentrated kitty shenanigans". The final chosen videos were divided into categories such as comedy, documentary, animated, and foreign. The "People's Choice" vote was open from August 6–12, 2012. The Golden Kitty award, chosen by visitors to the Walker's web site, went to Will Braden for his two-minute short "Henri, Paw de Deux".

== See also ==
- CatVideoFest
- Henri, le Chat Noir
- lolcat
- The Internet and cats
