= Chmonya =

Internet meme

Chmonya (Virgo)
- A photo of Virgo on a car dashboard inspired the internet meme about Chmonya the cat.
- Other name: Little Russian cat
- Years active: 2021-present
- Opponent: Internet meme

Chmonya (real name Virgo) is a Russian internet meme featuring a domestic cat named Virgo, who became popular online after her owner posted a photo of her on Reddit in 2021 when she was still a kitten. The photo later became a popular internet meme: Twitter users nicknamed the kitten "Chmonya", pretended to be her owner, and created stories featuring her in various situations.

== Biography ==
Virgo is a black-and-white domestic cat who belongs to a Reddit user named f3I2g who began posting photos of the cat on the site in the fall of 2020. The user's profile also includes photos of an adult Virgo.

== Internet meme ==
In February 2021, Virgo's owner posted a photo on Reddit of Virgo sitting on a car dashboard. The photo was subsequently added to "little kitten" collections and shared on social media. In late December 2021, a Twitter user, antipillz, posted a photo of Virgo with the caption "we're going", which went viral. The user later clarified that he had found the image online. In the comments section, one user posted an edited photo claiming to have applied a filter to the kitten, which identified the cat as "chmonya" with 100% certainty, giving rise to the cat's nickname and the internet meme. Internet users also nicknamed Chmonya "the little Russian cat," a reference to the "big Russian cat"—a caracal known as Big Floppa.

In early January 2022, the kitten became a popular internet meme: some Twitter users pretended to be its owner, while others wrote stories in which Chmonya visited Donbas, became the leader of protests in Kazakhstan, became a video game character, or became Vladimir Putin's successor as the President of Russia. Many Twitter users changed their account names and avatars in honor of the kitten.

== See also ==
- Cats and the Internet
- List of individual cats
