= Alpo (pet food) =

Dog food brand

- Type: Private
- Industry: Pet food
- Founded: 1936; 90 years ago
- Area served: Worldwide
- Products: Dog food
- Owner: Nestlé Purina PetCare
- Website: www.purina.com/alpo

Alpo is an American brand of dog food marketed and manufactured by the Nestlé Purina PetCare subsidiary of Nestlé. The brand is offered as a canned or packaged soft food, as well as in dry kibbles.

== History ==
Alpo, an abbreviation of Allen Products, was founded in 1936 by Robert F. Hunsicker in Allentown, Pennsylvania.

In 1964, the Allen Products Company was acquired by Liggett & Myers Tobacco Company. In 1980, the Liggett & Myers Tobacco Company was acquired by Grand Metropolitan; and, in 1986, Grand Metropolitan sold the Liggett Group, but retained Alpo Petfoods, Inc. In 1995, Nestlé SA acquired Alpo Petfoods, Inc. from Grand Metropolitan. The acquisition was approved by the F.T.C. In January 2001, Nestlé SA announced the merger of Nestlé Friskies with Ralston Purina to form the Nestlé Purina PetCare Company.

== Marketing ==
For many years, the brand's main television commercial spokesman was Lorne Greene, who created the concept of eating one's own dog food by claiming that Alpo is so good he feeds it to his own dogs. Ed McMahon also had an association with the product on television, and Garfield was a "spokescat" for the brand in the 1990s. Alpo was the sponsor of the debut broadcast of the long-running television news magazine 60 Minutes, on September 24, 1968.

Alpo had an advertisement on the left-center field wall at Connie Mack Stadium, home of the Philadelphia Phillies, from the mid-1950s through the park's closure in 1970.

Alpo is also known for its marketing campaigns that target the owners of "real dogs", making light of consumers who pamper their dogs.
