= Nestlé Purina PetCare =

American pet food manufacturer, subsidiary of the Swiss corporation Nestlé

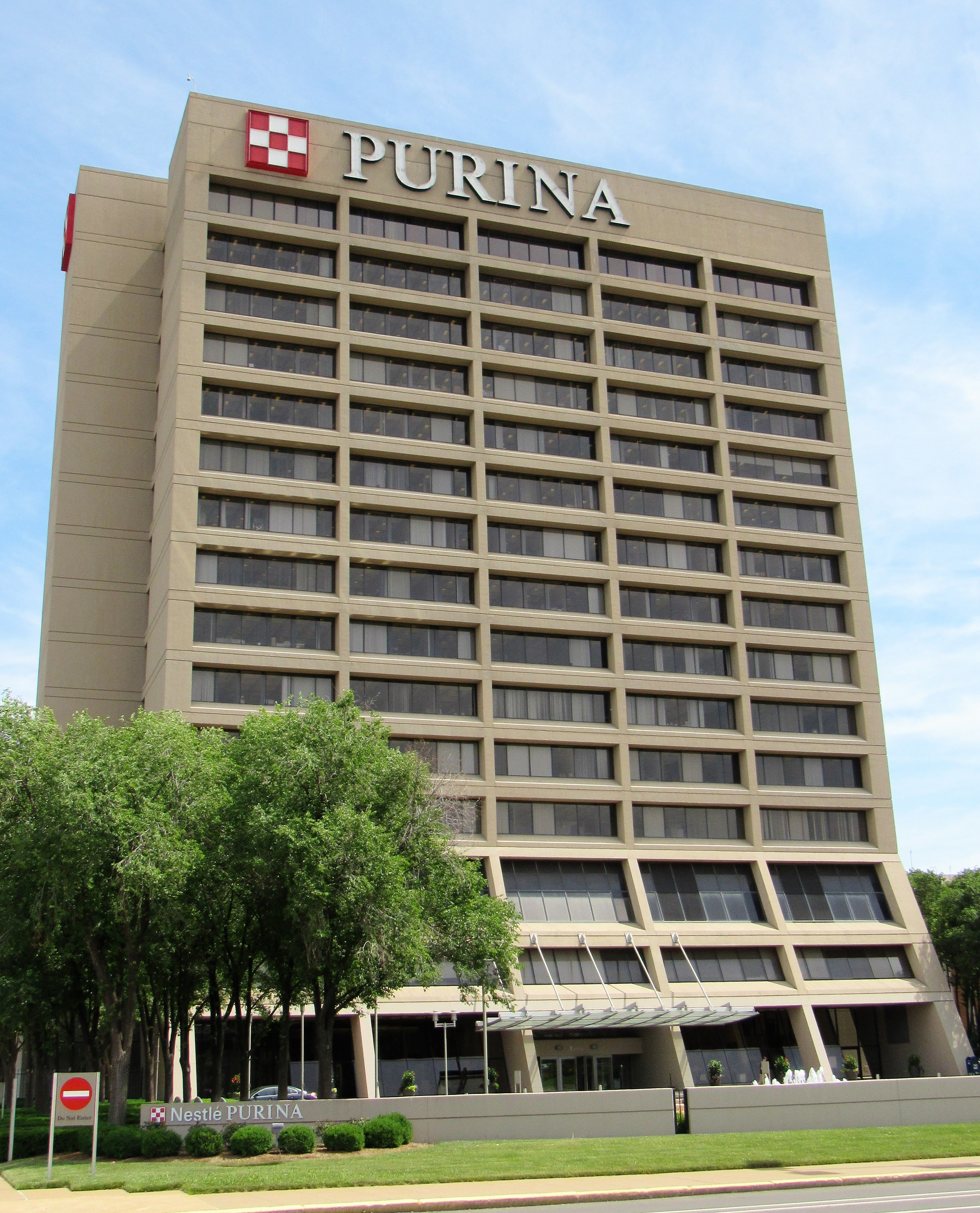
- Nestlé Purina Petcare's Headquarters
- Type: Subsidiary
- Industry: Pet food
- Predecessors: Ralston Purina; Friskies Petcare Company
- Founded: December 12, 2001; 24 years ago St. Louis, Missouri, US
- Headquarters: 800 Chouteau Ave, St. Louis, Missouri, US
- Area served: Worldwide
- Key people: Nina Leigh Krueger (CEO)
- Products: Dog food; Cat food; Animal health products; Dog Treats; Cat litter; Dog & Cat Supplements; Dog & Cat Probiotics
- Brands: Friskies; Purina One; Beyond; Muse; Felix; Cat Chow; Dog Chow; Kit 'n Kaboodle; Fancy Feast; Beneful; Tidy Cats; ProPlan; Alpo
- Revenue: $11.2 billion (2013)
- Number of employees: 15,000 (global); 8,000 (North America) (2016)
- Parent: Nestlé S.A.
- Website: purina.com

Nestlé Purina PetCare Company (/pjʊˈriːnə/), or simply Purina, is an American subsidiary of the Swiss corporation Nestlé, based in St. Louis, Missouri. Founded in 1893 by William H. Danforth, it produces and markets pet food, treats, and cat and dog litter. Some of its pet food brands include Purina Pro Plan, Purina Dog Chow, Friskies, Beneful and Purina ONE. The company was formed in 2001 by combining Nestlé's Friskies PetCare Company with Ralston Purina, which acquired it for $10.3 billion. As of 2012, it is the second-largest pet food company globally (the first being Mars Petcare) and the largest in the United States.

== Corporate history ==
=== Origins ===
In 1894, William H. Danforth partnered with George Robinson and William Andrews, as they entered the business of feeding farm animals by founding the Purina Mills in St. Louis, Missouri. The name was changed to Ralston Purina in 1902. In the same year Ralston Purina built its first building at the current headquarters, 800 Chouteau Ave, St. Louis, Missouri.

In 2001, Cargill acquired Agribrands International and decided to retain the Purina brand. At the same time, the pet food division was sold to the Nestlé Group.

Nestlé Purina PetCare was formed in December 2001, when Nestlé acquired Ralston Purina for $10.3 billion and merged it with Nestlé's pet food business, Friskies PetCare Company. Ralston had marketed the Dog Chow, Cat Chow and Pro Plan pet food brands, while Nestlé produced Friskies and Alpo brand pet foods.

The merger was opposed by consumer advocates, such as the Consumer Federation of America, owing to anti-trust concerns. The two companies combined would become the largest pet food brand by market share with 45 percent of the cat food market. The Federal Trade Commission approved the merger after the Meow Mix and Alley Cat brands from Ralston were sold to J.W. Childs Equity Partners, creating the separate Meow Mix Company. Ralston's St Louis, Missouri location was chosen as the new company's North American headquarters.

=== Early history ===
Nestlé Purina PetCare continued integrating the two companies through 2002. It cut back dry dog-food manufacturing at facilities inherited from Friskies PetCare Company in Jefferson, Wisconsin, St Joseph, Missouri and Arden Hills, Minnesota, then moved those operations to manufacturing facilities acquired from Ralston. Expanded manufacturing facilities were planned in Dunkirk, New York and the St. Joseph location was later expanded for wet-food production. In Asia, it shifted from a "dealer system" to managing its distribution. In 2004, Nestlé Purina merged its North American and Latin America operations into a Nestlé Purina PetCare Americas division.

Nestlé Purina Petcare grew from about 11 percent of Nestlé's revenues in 2001, to one-third by 2005. By 2006, it was the largest market-share holder in the pet food industry with 32 per cent of the market.

=== Recent history ===
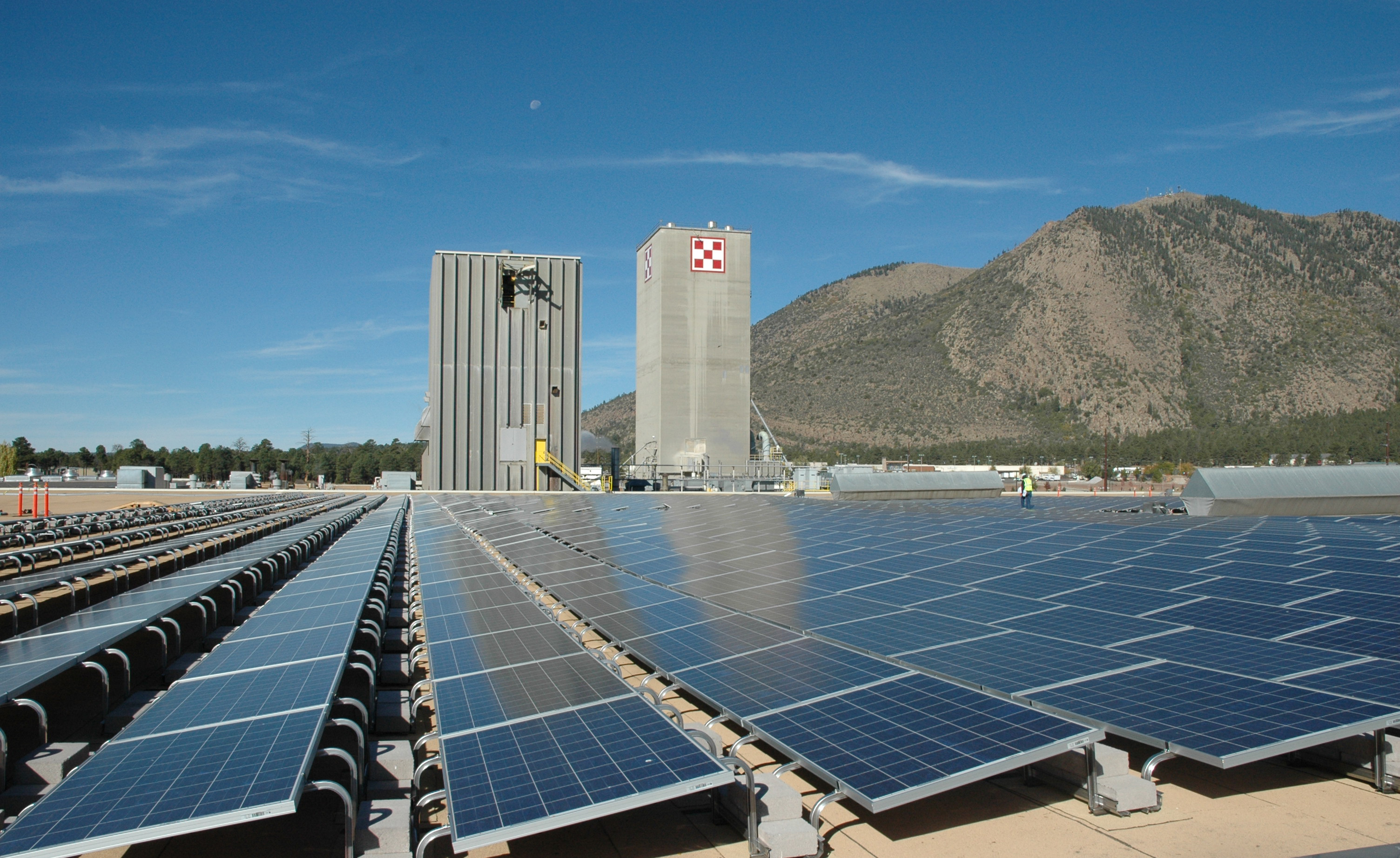
Nestlé Purina's solar farm at its plant in Arizona

By 2009, Purina was one of Nestlé's fastest-growing divisions, due to an increasing willingness by consumers to spend more money on pet care. In 2008, it formed a separate company called PurinaCare with headquarters in San Antonio, Texas that sold pet insurance. PetCare was later acquired by Pethealth Inc. in 2013. By 2009 Purina had also introduced pet litter products and built new manufacturing facilities in Russia and Thailand. Its Colorado plant built the largest privately owned solar panel system in the state. In September 2010, Nestlé reached an agreement to acquire Waggin' Train, a producer of pet treats with $200 million in annual revenues.

From 2010 to 2012, Nestlé expanded its manufacturing operations in Australia, Hungary and Germany. It also implemented the company's largest solar panel farm at its facilities in Atlanta, Georgia. In 2013, Nestlé Purina PetCare acquired the pet adoption website Petfinder. The following year it acquired Zuke's, a producer of cat and dog treats. In April 2014, Nestlé Purina PetCare opened the first cat café in the US.

In February 2019, the company announced plans to spend $115 million to expand its factory in Bloomfield, Missouri, to support the demand for its cat litter. In November, the company invested $320 million in an old textile factory in Hartwell, Georgia.

In April 2020, Nestlé Purina PetCare acquired Lily's Kitchen, a UK-based natural pet food brand. In November 2020, Purina announced Nina Leigh Krueger as the new company CEO. Krueger is the first female CEO of Nestlé Purina PetCare for the Americas.

In October 2022, Purina announced the opening of its new facility in Rayong, Thailand.

Later in November, Nestlé Purina PetCare announced its alliance with Riceland Foods to work on encouraging Riceland farm members to cultivate and grow rice with sustainable techniques starting in 2023. The same year, Purina announced its partnership with pet-care startups from Europe and North Africa to meet the demands of more sustainable solutions for the well-being of pets.

In 2023, it was announced that Purina's portfolio specifically entailed dry dog food (30%), wet dog food (4%), dry cat food (19%), wet cat food (32%) and other pet nutrition products (15%). In February 2023, Purina reported its plan to acquire Red Collar Pet Foods' pet treats factory in Miami. In October 2023, Purina announced the opening of two new production units at its factory in Hungary.

In 2024, Purina PetCare invested €472 million to open a pet food factory in Mantua, Italy. It also opened a new facility in Eden. Later, in May, Purina invested $220 million to stimulate production in Mexico.

By 2025, Purina PetCare Europe has factories in France, Germany, Hungary, Italy, Poland, United Kingdom and Spain.

On August 31, 2026, Purina opened a $550 million pet food factory in Batavia, Ohio which they claim as their first ground-up factory construction since 1975.

=== Legal issues ===
In May 2014, Nestlé Purina PetCare began a legal dispute with Blue Buffalo regarding its advertising practices. Blue Buffalo advertised that its products contain no meat byproduct or corn, whereas Purina said independent lab tests confirmed that they do. Blue Buffalo made similar allegations against Purina in a counter-suit less than a week later. It also alleged Purina was engaging in what it characterized as a "smear campaign". The National Advertising Review Board and the Advertising Self-Regulatory Council found that Blue Buffalo's advertising was misleading and its claims that competitors were hiding information about their ingredients were unsubstantiated. Blue Buffalo said it disagreed but would obey the ruling.

In 2015, after a dog died and others got sick, a class action lawsuit was filed against Purina alleging that the company's Beneful brand of dog food contained propylene glycol and mycotoxins produced by mould found in grains – grain being a major ingredient in Beneful. The lawsuit was dismissed when the judge ruled that the plaintiff's attorneys did not prove that the food caused the dogs' illnesses, and the dog's death was found to have been caused by a heart tumour.

In April 2017, another lawsuit stating that Purina's Beggin' line of dog treats was falsely advertised to be "full of bacon", was dropped.

In April 2020, a class action lawsuit was filed in Missouri claiming that Purina knowingly sold pet food products containing alarming amounts of glyphosate, a known carcinogen.

In August 2021, another class action lawsuit was filed in Missouri, this time claiming that certain Purina pet food products were falsely advertised as grain free when they contained wheat and/or soy.

=== Recalls ===
In 2005, Nestlé Purina Petcare voluntarily recalled all of its dry pet food produced from a plant in La Encrucijada, Venezuela after an internal investigation verified contaminants that were causing illnesses in pets. According to Fortune Magazine, in 2007 the pet food market "plunged into turmoil" due to the widespread discovery of contaminated ingredients. During this period, Nestle Purina voluntarily recalled some of its Alpo Prime Cuts in Gravy products in the US that contained wheat gluten from China contaminated with melamine.

In August 2013, Purina recalled some of its Purina ONE Beyond dog food, because of one bag that was found to contain salmonella. In 2012, a consumer sued Nestlé Purina PetCare when his pet died after eating Waggin' Train treats. The Food and Drug Administration received more than 900 reports from grieving pet owners that alleged the treatment was causing illness or death in their pets due to chicken products from China. The FDA had issued warnings regarding these ingredients, and the New York State Department of Agriculture & Markets reported finding antibiotics in the chicken used in the Waggin' Train treats that were not legal for consumption in the United States. Later that year, another consumer started a petition on Change.org asking retailers to voluntarily stop carrying the product. The petition attracted 60,000 signatures. The following year, Waggin' Train and Canyon Creek dog treats were voluntarily taken off the market temporarily after the New York State Department of Agriculture and Markets identified trace amounts of antibiotic residue. In early 2014, a $6.5 million settlement was reached, pending approval by the court. According to The Washington Post, the company later re-introduced the brands after "revamping its manufacturing process and overhauling its supply chain".

In 2019, Nestlé Purina PetCare recalled some of its 'Muse wet cat food' due to potential contamination with black plastic pieces.

In 2023, Nestlé Purina Petcare voluntarily recalled some Purina Pro Plan dry dog food in the United States due to elevated levels of Vitamin D.

== Products and services ==
According to a SWOT analysis by MarketLine, Nestlé Purina PetCare's pet food brands that contribute substantially to revenue include Purina, Purina Dog Chow, Friskies, Purina Beneful and Purina One. Some brands, such as Friskies, are intended for budget shoppers, while others like Purina One and Beneful cost more and are for health or ingredient-conscious consumers. Purina One has been its fastest-growing brand. Purina One offers products for sterilized cats. The brand also incorporates product lines with lactobacillus.

== Marketing and advertising ==
In the mid-1970s, the Purina Cat Chow brand launched the "Chow-Chow-Chow" advertising campaign, variations of which would run for the next 20 years. The television commercials featured cats seemingly dancing the cha-cha-cha, through a post-production and editing trick that involved rapidly playing the film forward and backward, giving the humorous illusion of the cats dancing as they walked or ran in time with the music. The earliest such spots featured character actress Patsy Garrett, who would appear in several other Cat Chow spots as an official spokesperson for many more years.

In 2006, Nestlé Purina Petcare introduced a sponsored email application, Doggie-Mail, that could send messages online through a talking dog. In 2009, it sponsored the PawNation.com site developed by AOL, which hosted crowd-sourced pet videos, tips, Q&As and other content about pet ownership. Purina also sponsored Martha Stewart's pet tips site, Living Omnimedia. The company introduced an advertising campaign for the Alpo brand with the slogan "Real dogs eat meat". In the ad, over-pampered pets were "rescued" and fed Alpo, implying that pets needed to stay in touch with their primal nature by eating real meat. In 2009, it released a free iPhone app called "petcentric places" that allows users to map local pet-related locations, like dog parks or pet-friendly hotels. In 2010, Purina released a branded Facebook game called Purina Pet Resort, where players manage a virtual pet resort.

In 2011, Nestlé Purina PetCare became the official sponsor of the Westminster show hosted by the American Kennel Club. The company introduced a competition for pet owners to win a part-time job earning $50,000 annually to travel with their cat, interview other pet owners and write for the Purina website. Nestle Purina also produced television advertisements intended for Austria that had audio effects only pets could hear. It was the first set of advertisements targeting pets directly, rather than their owners.

In 2012, Purina and another Nestlé business, Jenny Craig, jointly created "Project: Pet Slim Down", an online program intended to help pets and pet owners lose weight together. Grumpy Cat became a "spokescat" for the Friskies brand in late 2013. In 2013, Purina featured ads during the Westminster Show that featured crowd-sourced videos submitted to Purina in response to the question "How is Your Dog Great?".

== Operations ==
=== Headquarters ===
Nestlé Purina PetCare is operated as a subsidiary of Nestlé. It is headquartered in St. Louis, Missouri and has operations in North America, Asia, Africa, Europe, Latin America and Oceania. There are sixteen buildings on 50 acres at its headquarters, including a 15-story main tower, four-story research facility built in 2010 and a Learning and Training centre built in 2011. In 2010, Purina built the $10 million Purina Event Center for dog shows and competitions. Nestlé Purina Petcare sponsors various charitable activities, such as the Pet Care Pride Day annual event where employees do volunteer work. Employees are allowed to bring their pets to work. The company has on-site gyms, physical fitness trainers, medical care, and an employee turnover of approximately 5 per cent. NestlePurina also has its in-house creative agency called, CheckMark. Purina's St Louis headquarters houses between 2,500 and 3000 employees and also houses IT and auditing departments as part of Nestle Shared Services.

In Europe, Purina's headquarters is located in La Tour-de-Peilz, Switzerland. Purina in 2023 employed a total of 9,591 people in their factories and offices in countries across Nestlé Purina Europe.

=== Statistics ===
As of 2005, Purina PetCare was Nestlé's second most profitable division behind pharmaceuticals. It was the largest pet food manufacturer by market share in the US and the second-largest in Europe. As of 2012, globally Purina has a 23.1 per cent share of the pet food market, while its largest competitor, Mars, has a 23.4 per cent share. According to a Research and Markets report, competition between Nestlé and Mars has been "fierce."

In 2010, Nestlé Purina PetCare won the Malcolm Baldrige National Quality Award based on organizational and manufacturing performance. Its manufacturing operations have continuously reduced the amount of materials used in packaging, increased the recycling of waste products and reduced water usage, in addition to installing solar panels to produce electricity for its offices and facilities. As of 2014, it has 19 manufacturing plants. (Note: Nestle Purina had 26 manufacturing facilities in 2012)

In 2021, Purina PetCare enabled Nestlé to reach its highest sales in five years. During the pandemic, consumers tended to buy petcare supplements.

In FY21, Purina PetCare's annual revenue reached US$16.903 billion. By the start of 2022, Purina PetCare's sales witnessed an increase of nearly 14%. Indeed, Purina PetCare sales grew each quarter in 2022. In that year, Purina managed to rise and eventually lead to Nestlé's expansion worldwide. Also, Purina PetCare accounted for 90% of Nestlé's online pet sales in 2022. For instance, Purina's sales underwent a double-digit growth in China due to sales in online commerce and pet speciality. Accordingly, Purina's sales in FY22 reached $19.385 billion and its organic growth attained 14.5%. It was announced in 2023 that North America and Europe were still Purina's 'largest segments'.

In January 2023, Purina was the largest pet care company in the US. The same year, in March, it was announced that Purina PetCare was the second largest category of Nestlé, following coffee, and had the largest market share in the U.S. During the first three months of 2023, Purina PetCare sales were US$5,267 million. Accordingly, Purina remained the "largest contributor" to Nestlé's organic growth. Dry dog food, dry cat food and wet cat food make up 80% of Purina's sales. Purina PetCare's performance during the first half of 2023, contributed the most to Nestlé as its sales from January to June reached US$10,799.

== See also ==
- W. Patrick McGinnis, former president and CEO (2001–2015), then non-executive chairman (2015–2017)
