= Fancy Feast =

Brand of cat food

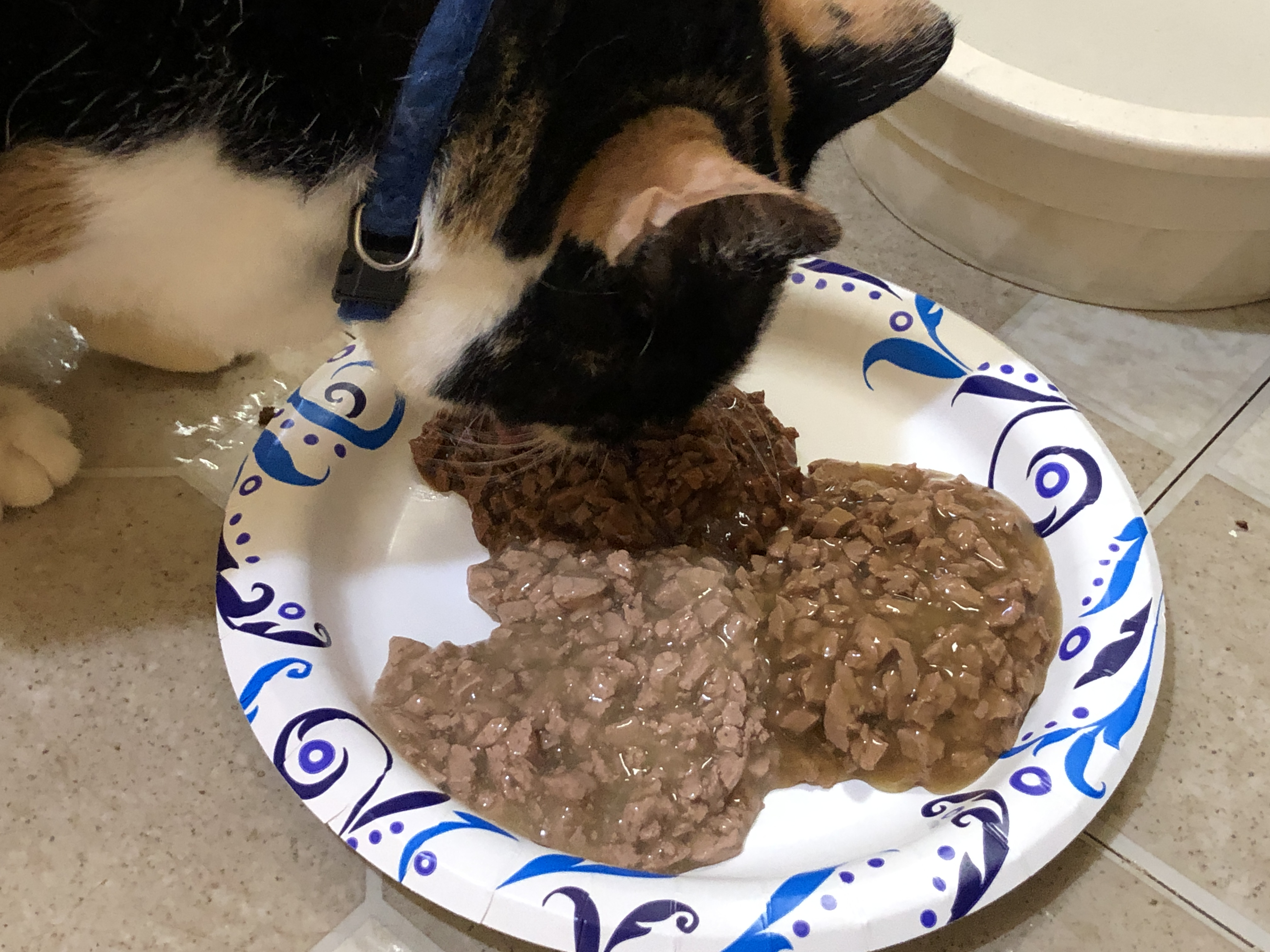
- A cat eating Fancy Feast
- Product type: Cat food
- Current owner: Nestlé Purina PetCare
- Introduced: 1982
- Markets: Worldwide
- Previous owners: Friskies PetCare Company (1985–2001), Carnation Company (1982–1985)
- Website: Fancy Feast

Fancy Feast is a brand of cat food from Nestlé Purina PetCare. Introduced by the Carnation Company in 1982, it was originally offered in seven flavors of wet food.

== History ==
In 1982, Fancy Feast was introduced in 3-ounce cans of wet food in seven different varieties. It was the first cat food to market itself as "gourmet". In its original commercial, an announcer said, "Your cat give you that cold shoulder when you serve cold, leftover cat food? Watch it warm up to Fancy Feast". It also featured a white Persian cat that talked in her thoughts. It was sold along with Friskies and other pet foods in 1985 to Nestlé, and the merger became Friskies PetCare Company.

== Controversy ==
In December 2014, after reports about slave labor emerged from news outlets and nongovernmental organizations related to Purina pet foods, Nestlé launched an internal investigation. Their findings revealed that slave labor was present in their supply chain in Myanmar and Cambodia, where workers got trapped working on fishing vessels under inhumane conditions and for little to no pay. Nestlé then pledged to publish yearly reports and to work with suppliers to achieve a positive difference on how they source their ingredients.

In October 2023 a class action lawsuit was filed against Nestlé's Purina Pet Care for false advertising. Many consumers complained that Nestlé's Purina Pet Care food packaging claims to be "all-natural" but contain many synthetic ingredients in their pet food that is not considered as "natural " ingredients Fancy Feast wet food line being one of them. The case suggests that Nestlé' Purina Pet Care food has made a difference in profit due to the false "all natural" advertisement.8

== Slogans ==
- "Fancy Feast, darling?" (1982)
- "A moist and delicious meal in every can." (1982–1984)
- "Good taste is easy to recognize." (1982–2005)
- "Is it love, or is it Fancy Feast?" (2005–2008)
- "The best ingredient is love." (2010–present)

== Products ==
=== Collectible holiday ornaments ===
Fancy Feast annually releases a limited-edition ornament during the Christmas holiday. The first series ornament was released in 1984.

=== Current products ===
==== Wet ====
Classic Type

- Chicken Feast
- Cod, Sole and Shrimp Feast
- Salmon and Shrimp Feast
- Seafood Feast
- Tender Beef and Liver Feast (formerly known as Beef and Liver Feast)
- Tender Chicken and Liver Feast
- Chopped Grill Feast
- Ocean Whitefish and Tuna Feast
- Savory Salmon Feast
- Tender Beef and Chicken Feast
- Tender Beef Feast
- Turkey and Giblets Feast

Marinated Morsels

- Beef Feast in Gravy
- Tuna Feast in Gravy
- Salmon Feast in Gravy
- Turkey Feast in Gravy

Roasted

- Roasted Chicken Feast
- Roasted Turkey Feast

Flaked

- Flaked Chicken and Tuna Feast
- Flaked Salmon and Ocean Whitefish Feast
- Flaked Tuna and Mackerel Feast
- Flaked Fish and Shrimp Feast
- Flaked Trout Feast
- Flaked Tuna Feast

Chunky

- Chunky Chicken Feast
- Chunky Turkey Feast
- Chunky Chopped Grill Feast

Exclusive to China

- Select Tuna Chunks Feast
- Select Tuna Meat Feast
- Select Tuna Meat with Streaks of Crab Leg and Chicken Feast
- Select Tuna Meat with Streaks of Crab Leg Feast
- Select Tuna Meat with Small Whitebait Feast
- Select Carp with Prawn Feast
