= Felix (cat food) =

European brand of cat food

- Current logo
- Industry: Cat food
- Area served: Europe, India
- Parent: Nestlé Purina PetCare Company
- Website: Official website

Felix is a British brand of cat food currently owned by Nestlé Purina PetCare, a part of Swiss company Nestlé. It produces wet and dry food in both pouches and tins as well as dry cat biscuits and treats. The brand's mascot (since 1989) is a black and white cat named Felix.

== History ==
Felix Catfood Ltd began as a manufacturer of dry cat biscuits, which started operations before the Second World War. It had a single factory in the English town of Biggleswade, Bedfordshire. The Quaker Oats Company acquired the firm in 1970 as part of its expansion into the UK pet food market. Production was subsequently moved to the Quaker's factory in Southall, west London, and a new product range (including tinned wet food) was introduced.

During the 1980s, the Felix brand was facing a potential de-listing by large retailers due to poor sales and competition with their own-label cat foods. Felix only held a 6 per cent share of the UK cat food market, whereas the brand leader, Whiskas, had over 50 per cent. To combat this, the brand was re-launched in 1989 with a new product range and its iconic black-and-white "Felix" mascot. After a large newspaper, and later TV, advertising campaign it dramatically increased its market share across the UK and Europe. By 1996, Felix had overtaken Whiskas as the brand leader in the UK, reducing the latter's market share to 24 per cent, though Whiskas subsequently regained its former title.

Quakers sold Felix to Spillers (owned by Dalgety plc) alongside its whole European pet food division in 1995, and it was subsequently sold to Nestlé in 1997.

In 2023, Robbie Williams became the new voice of the brand Felix cat food with his track 'It's Great to be a Cat' for a new advertising campaign.

== Distribution ==
It is owned by Nestlé Purina PetCare Company and sold in Australia, Russia, the United Kingdom, Belgium, Slovenia, Ukraine, the Republic of Ireland, the Netherlands, Germany, India, Austria, Liechtenstein, Switzerland and Chile, as well as France, Italy, Greece, Sweden and Denmark under the name Pussi and Finland under the name Latz. The brand also sells milk.

Since 2018, Felix only produces its wet food, for UK market, in plastic sachets due to a decline in demand for tins.
