= CatVideoFest =

Film festival

CatVideoFest is an annual film festival for cat videos found on the internet.

It was founded in 2016 by Will Braden. He is the festival's curator. To prepare, he watches thousands of hours of cat videos. As of 2022, he has watched over 100,000 cat videos.

The 2025 festival held screenings in 200 theaters around the world, including in Canada, Australia, New Zealand, and United States.
