= Beneful =

Brand of dog food products

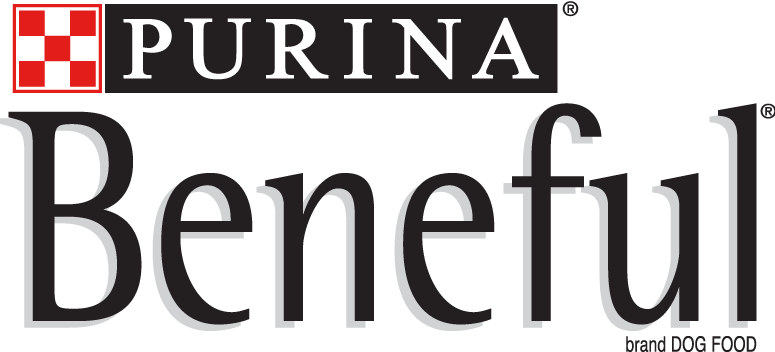
- Type: Private
- Industry: Pet food
- Founded: 2001; 25 years ago
- Area served: Worldwide
- Products: Dog food
- Owner: Nestlé Purina PetCare
- Website: www.purina.com/beneful

Beneful is a brand of dog food products by Nestlé Purina PetCare global that includes wet dog food, dry dog food and dog treats. As of 2012, it was the fourth most popular dog food brand, generating more than $1.5 billion in annual revenues. According to a SWOT analysis by Marketline, Beneful is one of Nestle Purina's more significant brands by revenue.

== History ==
The Beneful brand of dog food was introduced to the market in 2001. It was marketed on the basis of nutrition and appearance; it resembled stew and contained beef pieces. According to a company spokesperson, the term "Beneful" means "full of goodness". A $34-million Beneful television advertising campaign that aired that year was the largest in Nestle Purina's history. By the end of 2006, Beneful was generating $300 million in revenues. In the same year the company invested $36 million to upgrade facilities in St. Joseph, Missouri to produce more wet food. In 2010, Beneful attempted to "humanize" its dog food and introduced IncrediBites, a food in stay-fresh packaging with a smaller kibble size.

Beneful released a series of posters in Germany designed to attract dogs by releasing the smell of dog food. Following the poster promotion, in 2011, Beneful started airing television ads in Austria that included high pitch noises only dogs could hear to elicit a response from pets. Interactive billboards from Beneful were released in New York in May 2012, allowing people to play virtual fetch in a subway station. The dogs on the billboard can be customized and will follow a passerby to engage them. The billboards have also been installed in Chicago, Los Angeles, Atlanta and St. Louis. Beneful hosts an annual competition, the Beneful Dream Dog Park Contest, in which dog park designs are submitted for renovations. In 2013, 1,000 dog park designs were submitted for the $500,000 renovation. The program has produced parks in Johns Creek, Georgia, Alabaster, Alabama, and Lancaster, Pennsylvania.

== Products ==
Beneful exclusively produces food for dogs including dry food, wet or canned food, and various snacks. The Beneful Healthy Harvest product line, added in June 2005, was the company's first premium dry dog food to feature soy as the main protein source rather than meat. Beneful Prepared Meals were introduced in March 2006. With eight flavors, the line featured resealable, multipurpose packaging where the containers also serve as a dog food bowl. Beneful's packaging was recognized with the Pack Expo Selects Award at the Showcase of Packaging Innovations in 2007.

== 2015 lawsuit ==
In February 2015, a class action lawsuit was filed in the US District Court for Northern California against Nestle Purina Petcare alleging that the propylene glycol and mycotoxins contained in its Beneful dog food brand were toxins capable of poisoning and even killing pets. According to Purina, the company uses food-grade versions of the ingredients that are approved by the Food and Drug Administration (FDA) and is common in food items such as salad dressings and cake mix. According to the plaintiff, there were over 3,000 complaints from dog owners with pets showing symptoms consistent with mycotoxin poisoning, such as vomiting, diarrhea, weight loss and seizures.

Veterinarians have said grieving pet owners often falsely attribute ambiguous, non-specific symptoms to food. Tests by the FDA found no contaminants in the product.

The lawsuit was later changed to a claim of false advertising rather than harm to pets, but eventually all claims against Nestlé Purina were dismissed by the court.
