= Henri, le Chat Noir =

Web series known for its cat protagonist

Henri
- Henry, seen c. 2012, portrayed Henri, le Chat Noir.
- Other name: Henry
- Species: Felis catus
- Sex: Male
- Born: 2003
- Died: 2020 (aged 17)
- Nationality: United States
- Years active: 2007–2018
- Known for: Internet celebrity

Henri, le Chat Noir (French pronunciation: [ɑ̃ʁi lə ʃa nwaʁ]; French for 'Henry, the Black Cat') is a web series of short films on the existential musings of the cat Henri, written and directed by William Braden. Henri was portrayed by Henry (2003–2020), a male longhair tuxedo cat. Videos featuring Henri have been viewed millions of times, and have been featured by news outlets such as The Huffington Post and ABC News.

== Production ==
The first short film, Henri, was a project by William Braden, who was studying at the Seattle Film Institute. Braden was inspired by the American perception of French films as "very pretentious and self-involved. [...] And what could be more self-absorbed and pampered than a house cat?"

Braden wrote the scripts while his mother, who is fluent in French, helped with pronunciation and proper usage. Henri was written, filmed and edited in eleven days.

== Short films ==
=== Henri (2007) ===
A screenshot of Henry as Henri, le Chat Noir, in "Henri" (2007)

Henri was released on May 27, 2007. It was written and directed by Braden and produced by the Seattle Film Institute.

=== Henri 2, Paw De Deux (2012) ===
The second short film, Henri 2, Paw de Deux, was released on YouTube on April 6, 2012. Henri 2, Paw de Deux won the "Golden Kitty Award" for "Best Cat Video On The Internet" at the Walker Art Center's Internet Cat Video Festival. On September 8, 2012, Henri 2, Paw de Deux was shown on television during the season finale of Animal Planet's reality television show My Cat from Hell.

In receiving the award, director Braden told Mashable "This is a great honor. I don't think I've ever purred this loudly."

=== Henri 3, Le Vet (2012) ===
The third short film, Henri 3, Le Vet, was released on YouTube on June 20, 2012.

=== Henri - Politique (2012) ===
The fourth short film, Henri - Politique, was released on YouTube on September 27, 2012. Henri - Politique was produced as an example entry for The Seattle Times's political video contest.

=== Henri 4, L'Haunting (2012) ===
The fifth short film, Henri 4, L'Haunting, was released on YouTube on October 30, 2012.

=== Henri 5, "The Worst Noël" (2012) ===
The sixth short film, Henri 5, "The Worst Noël", was released on YouTube on December 21, 2012.

=== Henri - "On Cat Food Boredom" (2013) ===
Friskies commissioned a series of four short films on the subject of "cat food boredom".

The first part of this series, Henri - "On Cat Food Boredom", was released on YouTube on February 28, 2013.

The second part was released on March 13, 2013.

The third part was released on March 27, 2013.

The fourth and final part was released on April 15, 2013.

=== Henri 6, "Cat Littérature" (2013) ===
The eleventh short film, Henri 6, "Cat Littérature", was released on YouTube on April 30, 2013.

=== Henri 7 - "The Cat is Sat" (2013) ===
The twelfth short film, Henri 7 - "The Cat is Sat", was released on YouTube on August 28, 2013.

=== Henri 8 - "Artiste" (2014) ===
The thirteenth short film, Henri 8 - "Artiste", was released on YouTube on January 7, 2014.

=== Henri 9 - "Blight of Spring" (2014) ===
The fourteenth short film, Henri 9 - "Blight of Spring", was released on YouTube on May 6, 2014.

=== Henri 10 - "Reigning Cat and Dog" (2014) ===
The fifteenth short film, Henri 10 - "Reigning Cat and Dog", was released on YouTube on December 30, 2014.

=== Henri - "Bacon" (2015) ===
The sixteenth short film Henri - "Bacon" was released on YouTube on March 18, 2015, and was sponsored by Friskies.

=== Henri 11 - "Oh, revoir" (2018) ===
The seventeenth and final short film, Henri 11 - "Oh, revoir", was released on YouTube on May 18, 2018. It announced Henri's retirement from the film series. The ending card reads, "Henri thanks all of his fans/worshippers for all their support. He looks forward to a healthy and productive retirement. He might even sit on a lap."

== In print ==
Ten Speed Press, a subsidiary of Random House, released the book Henri, le Chat Noir: The Existential Musings of an Angst-Filled Cat, written by Braden, on April 30, 2013. A subsequent book, entitled Reflections on Human Folly, was published in paperback in 2016 thanks to a successful Kickstarter campaign that raised $12,038.

== Other media appearances ==
On November 13, 2014, Henry and Braden made an appearance as clients on Animal Planet's Tanked in which Braden consults with Brett Raymer and Wayde King on building an aquarium for Henri.

== Reception ==
Film critic Roger Ebert called Henri 2, Paw De Deux "The best internet cat video ever made." Boing Boing's science editor Maggie Koerth-Baker also called Henri 2, Paw De Deux "The best cat video on the Internet". The Atlantic reviewed the short film as "a little bit arty, a little bit cheeky, decisively feline in focus ... it's perfect. Or, er, purrfect."

The Huffington Post, in reviewing Henri 3, Le Vet, called Henri "almost like a feline Serge Gainsbourg, just without the singing, or the alcoholism, or the public scandal. Or maybe he's not like that at all. Maybe Henri, is, as he so eloquently states in his latest film, his 'own cat.'"

== Henry ==
=== Personal life ===
Henry was adopted from the Seattle Animal Shelter in Seattle, Washington. by Braden's mother. Braden described Henry as "a good[-]natured and happy cat" who "never suffered a single existential crisis during his life," enjoyed chin scratches, and had nothing in common with the brooding character Henri he portrayed on film.

=== Death ===
On December 10, 2020, Braden announced that Henry had been euthanized at the age of 17 because of a debilitating deterioration of his spine.

== See also ==
- List of individual cats
