= Grumpy Cat =

Cat and internet meme celebrity (2012–2019)

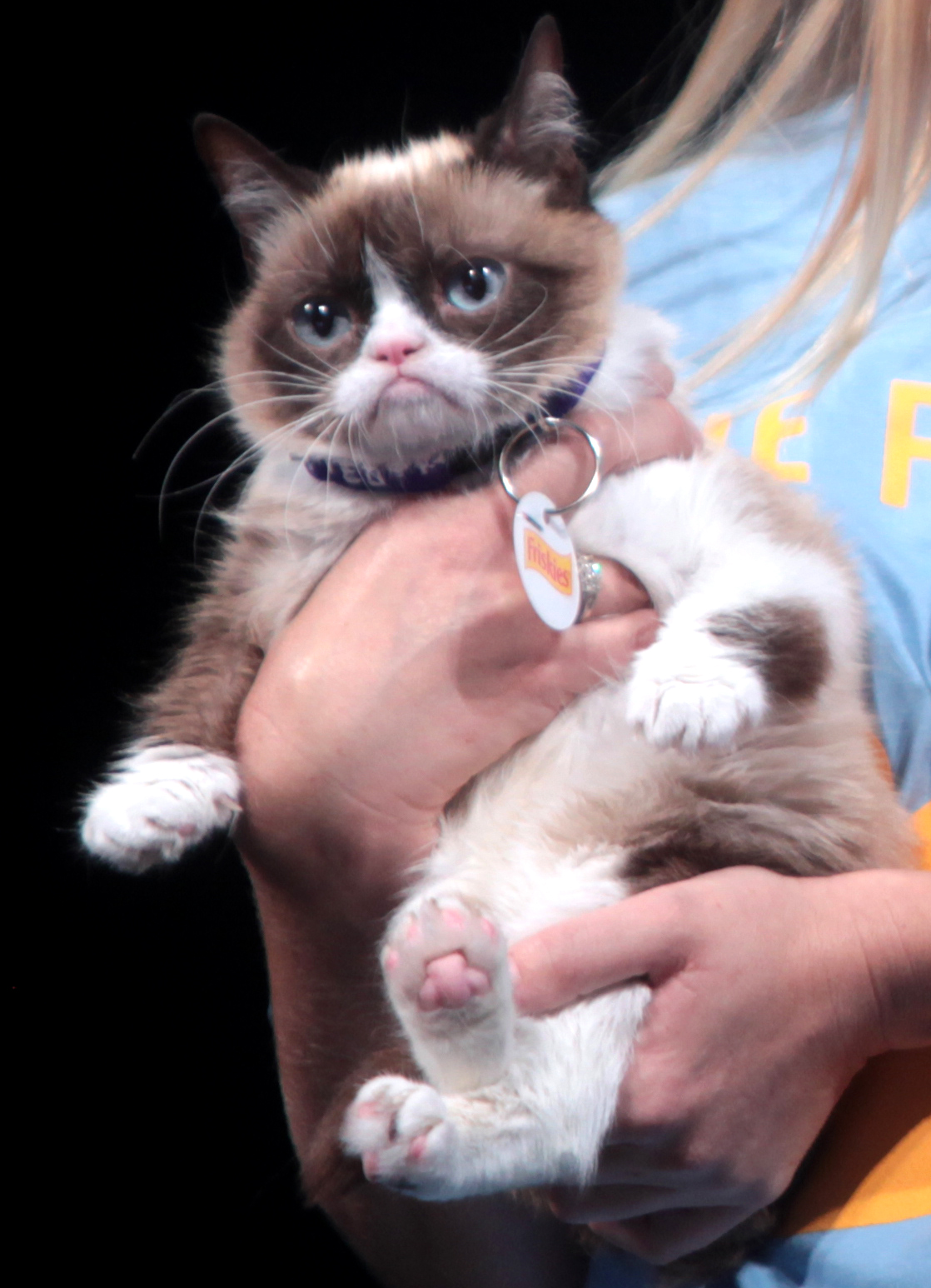
- Grumpy Cat at VidCon 2014
- Other name: Tardar Sauce
- Species: Domestic cat
- Breed: Mixed
- Sex: Female
- Born: April 4, 2012; Morristown, Arizona, U.S.
- Died: May 14, 2019 (aged 7); Morristown, Arizona, U.S.
- Cause of death: Urinary tract infection
- Years active: 2012–2019
- Known for: Being an Internet meme
- Owner: Tabatha Bundesen
- Named after: Tartar sauce
- www.grumpycats.com

Tardar Sauce (April 4, 2012 – May 14, 2019), nicknamed Grumpy Cat, was an American internet celebrity cat. She was known for her permanently "grumpy" facial appearance, which was caused by an underbite and feline dwarfism. She came to prominence when a photograph of her was posted on September 22, 2012, on social news website Reddit by Bryan Bundesen, the brother of her owner Tabatha Bundesen. "Lolcats" and parodies created from the photograph by Reddit users became popular. She was the subject of a popular Internet meme in which humorously negative, cynical images were made from photographs of her.

As of June 3, 2023, Grumpy Cat had 8.3 million total likes on Facebook, 2.5 million followers on Instagram 1.3 million followers on Twitter and 275,000 subscribers on YouTube.

== Background ==
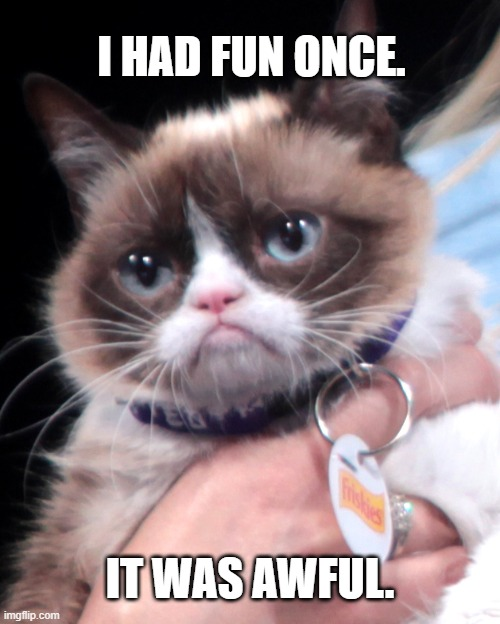
An example of a Grumpy Cat Internet meme.

Tardar Sauce was one of a litter of four kittens born to a calico mother and a blue-and-white tabby putative father at the home of her owner, Tabatha Bundesen of Morristown, Arizona. The Bundesens said that Tardar Sauce's face appeared grumpy because the feline had a form of dwarfism. Though the mother and father were described as "normal-sized domestic short-hair cats", Tardar Sauce was undersized and had hind legs that were "a bit different". Both she and her brother, Pokey, were born with "a flat face, bubble eyes, and a short tail". Although she had a "grumpy" appearance and was called "Grumpy Cat", according to the Bundesens, "Ninety-nine percent of the time she is just a regular cat."

"Meme manager" Ben Lashes represented Grumpy Cat, in addition to Keyboard Cat and Nyan Cat. In 2013, Tabatha Bundesen took a leave of absence from her job at Red Lobster to manage Grumpy Cat's schedule, while her brother Bryan Bundesen managed the Grumpy Cat website, Facebook, YouTube and Twitter accounts.

== Friskies sponsorship ==
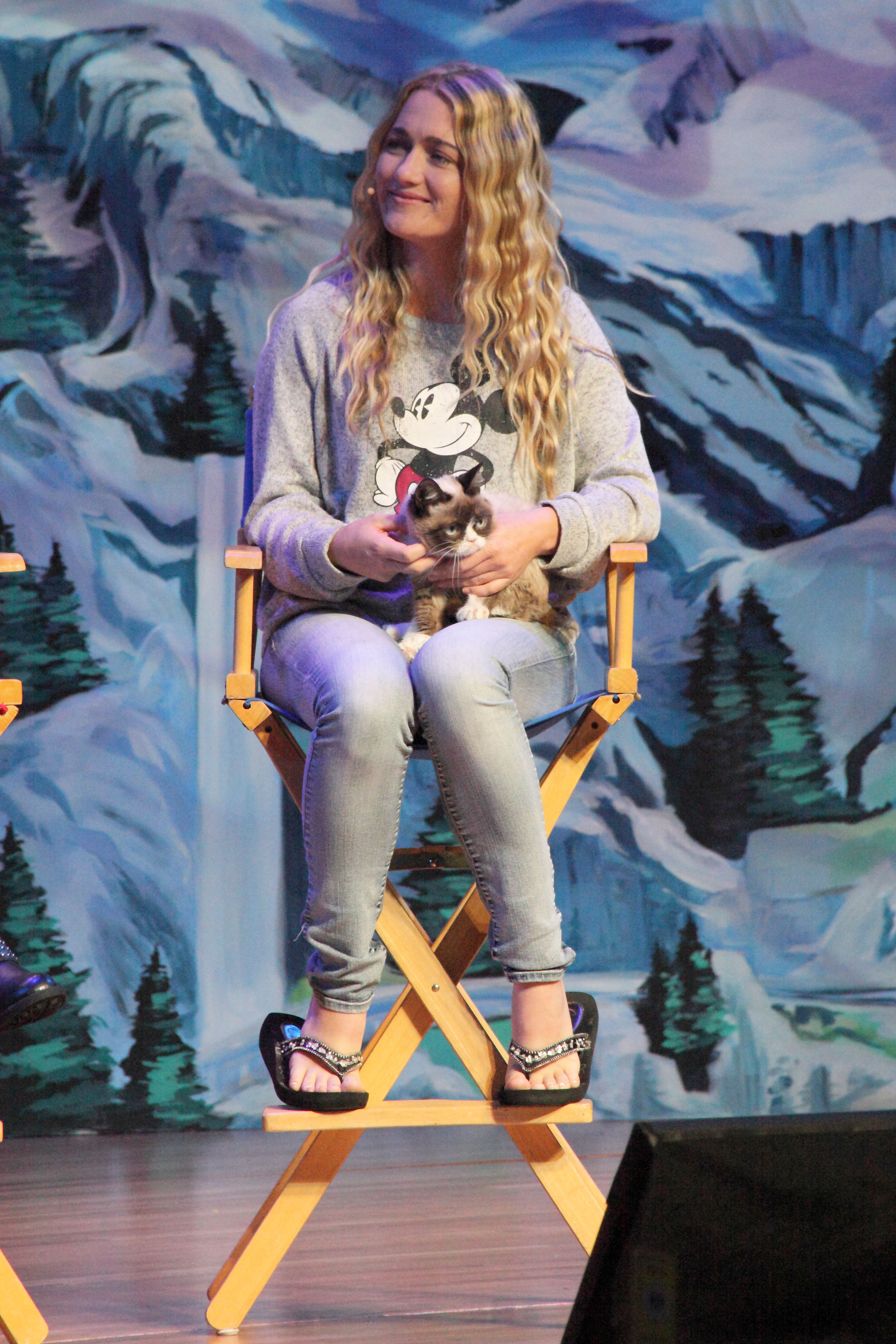
Tabatha Bundesen and Grumpy Cat in 2014

Grumpy Cat appeared in episodes of the Friskies YouTube game show "Will Kitty Play With It?" In September 2013, it was announced that Grumpy Cat would become the Official Spokescat of Friskies. TMZ reported that for Grumpy Cat's SXSW Interactive appearance in Austin, Texas, Friskies paid for first-class flights, a private hotel room with king-sized bed, a personal assistant, a chauffeur, and unlimited Friskies food and bottled water. On March 22, 2013, Grumpy Cat traveled to New York City promoting the show and appeared on Good Morning America and Anderson Live, and visited Time for a photo shoot.

== Merchandising ==
Grumpy Cat Limited held eight trademarks in August 2018 registered with the United States Patent and Trademark Office; 1082 items were available on the official Grumpy Cat online shop.

=== Licensed merchandise ===
Licensed merchandise like T-shirts and mugs are advertised on the Grumpy Cat website and sold at Hot Topic. Stuffed toys are also available, the original official plush was produced by Gund, though as of August 2018, no Grumpy Cat merchandise was available on the Gund website. Ganz, the company behind Webkinz, produced a small Grumpy Cat plush which allowed anyone to play with her electronic likeness on the Webkinz website.

Additionally, Chronicle Books has published The Grumpy Cat Wall Calendar each year since 2013, with a 2022 edition available as of January 2022.

=== Books ===
The official Grumpy Cat book, Grumpy Cat: A Grumpy Book, was published on July 23, 2013, by Chronicle Books. The book is available in both print and digital formats from retailers worldwide. It debuted at #8 hardcover nonfiction on the Publishers Weekly best seller list. Another Grumpy Cat book called The Grumpy Guide to Life: Observations by Grumpy Cat was published by Chronicle Books and debuted at #3 on The New York Times Best Seller list in the Advice, How-To and Miscellaneous category.

Dynamite Entertainment publishes a comic book about Grumpy Cat and her brother, titled The Misadventures of Grumpy Cat and Pokey.

Dover Publications has also published Grumpy Cat paper doll, sticker, coloring, and tattoo books.

=== Digital products ===
An official video game Grumpy Cat: Unimpressed was released in December 2013 by Ganz Studios. Playable on Facebook, iOS devices and Android devices, the game is a match-three game where if combos are performed, Grumpy Cat's insults will appear. The players unlock her memes as they pass each level and she can be made angry with meows, hairballs and laser pointers.

== Legal issues ==
=== Grumpy Cat Limited v. Grenade Beverage LLC ===
In May 2013, Grumpy Cat Limited partnered with Grenade Beverage LLC to market "Grumppuccino" iced coffee beverages.

In December 2015, Grumpy Cat Limited filed a lawsuit against Grenade Beverage LLC citing trademark infringement when the beverage company expanded its line of Grumpy Cat coffee offerings beyond what was originally agreed upon, producing and marketing a Grumpy Cat roasted ground coffee even after being told by email that they were not approved to do so.

In January 2018, the U.S. District Court for the Central District of California jury decided in favor of Grumpy Cat Limited, and ordered Grenade Beverage Company to pay $710,000 in damages for copyright and trademark infringement, as well as a $1 nominal damage fee for breach of contract.

== Death ==
Tardar Sauce died at her home in the arms of her owner Tabatha following complications from a urinary tract infection on May 14, 2019, at age 7. Her death was announced on May 17, 2019, on social media. Tributes were posted worldwide. She is buried at Sunland Pet Rest Cemetery in Sun City, Arizona.

== Film ==
Grumpy Cat appears in Lil Bub & Friendz, a documentary premiered at the Tribeca Film Festival on April 18, 2013, and won the Tribeca Online Festival Best Feature Film. In May 2013, Broken Road Productions optioned Grumpy Cat for a "Garfield-like feature film" adaptation. Film producer Todd Garner said, "We think we can build a big family comedy around this character".

On June 11, 2014, it was announced that Lifetime would produce a film starring Grumpy Cat, entitled Grumpy Cat's Worst Christmas Ever. The film debuted on November 29, 2014. Tim Hill, the film's director, and Jeff Morris wrote the script, and principal photography took place over the summer. Aubrey Plaza voiced the Grumpy Cat character, and was also a producer on the film. On November 6, 2014, Lifetime released a tongue-in-cheek video about the casting and Plaza's "process" for becoming the voice of Grumpy Cat.

The film received mostly negative reviews. On review aggregator Rotten Tomatoes, the film holds an approval rating of 27%, based on 11 reviews, and an average rating of 4.17/10.

== Earnings ==
In March 2013, Bryan Bundesen indicated that Grumpy Cat earned them income in the "mid-five figures", which increased to "low-six-figures" by May 2013. The Bundesens have not disclosed the Grumpy Cat brand's net worth, though online speculation estimates it between $1 million and $100 million.

== Recognition ==
- MSNBC named Grumpy Cat 2012's most influential cat.
- Grumpy Cat is one of a few select non-humans to receive one of The Wall Street Journal's signature stipple portraits.
- Grumpy Cat won BuzzFeed's Meme of the Year Award at the 2013 Webby Awards.
- Grumpy Cat won first prize Golden Kitty at the second annual Internet Cat Video Festival.
- Grumpy Cat won a Lifetime Achievement Award at the 2013 Friskies.
- Swarm by Foursquare released a limited-edition sticker featuring Grumpy Cat.
- Grumpy Cat won People's Voice Award in the Social Content and Marketing – Animals Category at the 2015 Webby Awards.

== See also ==
- Cats and the Internet
- List of animal actors
- List of individual cats
- List of Internet phenomena
