= Friskies =

American brand of cat food and treats

- Product type: Pet food – Cat food, Dog food
- Current owner: Nestlé Purina PetCare
- Introduced: 1930; 96 years ago
- Markets: Worldwide
- Previous owners: Carnation Company (1930s-1985)
- Tagline: Friskies For More (2004-2007); Feed The Senses (2007-2018); Feed Their Fantasy (2018-present)
- Website: Friskies

Friskies is an American brand of wet and dry cat food and treats owned by Nestlé Purina PetCare Company, a subsidiary of Nestlé global. Friskies was initially introduced by Carnation Company in the 1930s as a dog food brand. When Friskies cat food was introduced in the 1950s, it was the first dry pet food product specifically for cats. The brand was acquired by Nestlé in 1985. From the 1970s to the 2000s, variations in Friskies cat food proliferated as the competition for consumer spending intensified.

== Corporate ==
Friskies is produced and marketed by Nestlé Purina PetCare, a subsidiary of Nestlé. Friskies was first introduced in the 1930s by Carnation through its subsidiary, Albers Company. By 1973, Friskies was one of five companies that controlled two-thirds of the $1.75 billion pet food market. At the time Carnation was known for dry milk products, but also had operations processing animal feed for farms. It experimented with dry food products for 3.5 years at Carnation Farms, initially with stray dogs in improvised cages, and later with pure-breds in a formal kennel. Carnation International was formed in 1966 to market Carnation's pet food products internationally in Japan, Spain, France, England and Italy, among others.

Carnation was acquired by Nestlé in 1985 for $3 billion. After the acquisition, it was renamed Nestlé/Carnation Food Company, before becoming a Nestlé subsidiary in 1992, under the name Friskies PetCare Company. The Friskies brand had a market-share of 28.2% by 1992. Friskies was merged with Nestlé subsidiary Nestlé Purina Petcare in 2001, during the merger with former competitor Ralston Purina.

== History ==
Friskies was first introduced as a dry dog food brand in 1934. It introduced "Friskies Cubes" that year, which was followed by pellets called "Friskies Meal," eight years later. Friskies sold well as a dry dog food on the west coast of the United States, then was increasingly distributed on the east coast. Only dry food was initially produced, because consumers preferred less expensive products during the Great Depression and World War II led to the rationing of tin for canned pet foods, in order to preserve metal for the war effort. The rationing of tin led to a growth in sales of Friskies dry food products, as competitors that sold canned foods were forced to limit production. The first Friskies brand canned dog food was released in 1951 and nine Friskies products were released from 1958 to 1963.

When Friskies cat food was introduced in the 1950s, cats were becoming more popular as pets, but dry food for cats had not been introduced yet. In the early 1950s, a series of specialty dog food products were introduced under the Friskies brand, including one for puppies and cats. According to The Encyclopedia of Consumer Brands, "it was soon discovered that cats disliked the new 'puppy food'." A sales manager named Henry Arnest was considered "eccentric" for advocating that Friskies make a pet food specifically for cats. According to Arnest, the company thought it was "a nutty idea." He convinced Friskies executives to do a market trial for cat food, which was conducted on the west coast of the United States in 1956. The cat food was made of mackerel byproducts, cereals, vegetables and vitamins. The trial surprised Friskies executives when the cat food sold successfully.

The cat food product was named "Little Friskies for Cats." A cartoon cat was used as its mascot. It was advertised on television, newspapers, and through Friskies Research Digest, a publication for veterinarians and animal breeders published by Friskies. Canned "treats" for cats were first test-marketed in 1958. They were initially popular on the west coast of the United States, but not in the east. In 1959, Carnation executives considered withdrawing from the east coast market, because its cat food products were not popular there, but decided to stay. A Carnation report found that consumers preferred more upscale, single-serving food products, so the treats were rebranded as single-serving, canned foods called "Friskies Buffet" in 1967. Buffet became one of Friskies' best-sellers.

In the 1970s and 1980s, Friskies-brand food products were introduced in the "gourmet" industry category, such as Bright Eyes and Chef's Blend. A sister brand Mighty Dog was introduced in 1973, and another sister brand Fancy Feast was produced in 1982. By 1985, Friskies' producer was the largest manufacturer of pet food with a 14.5 percent market-share. Dry and wet food products specifically for kittens were introduced in 1988 and 1989 respectively. Fresh Catch, which contained only fish, was introduced in the early 1990s. According to industry analysts, competition in the pet food industry heightened by 1990. According to The Encyclopedia of Consumer Brands, the market was at "a virtual saturation point" with more than 400 pet food products on the market. Friskies was one of six brands that controlled 80 percent of the pet food market and competed intensely with one another.

== Advertising and endorsements ==
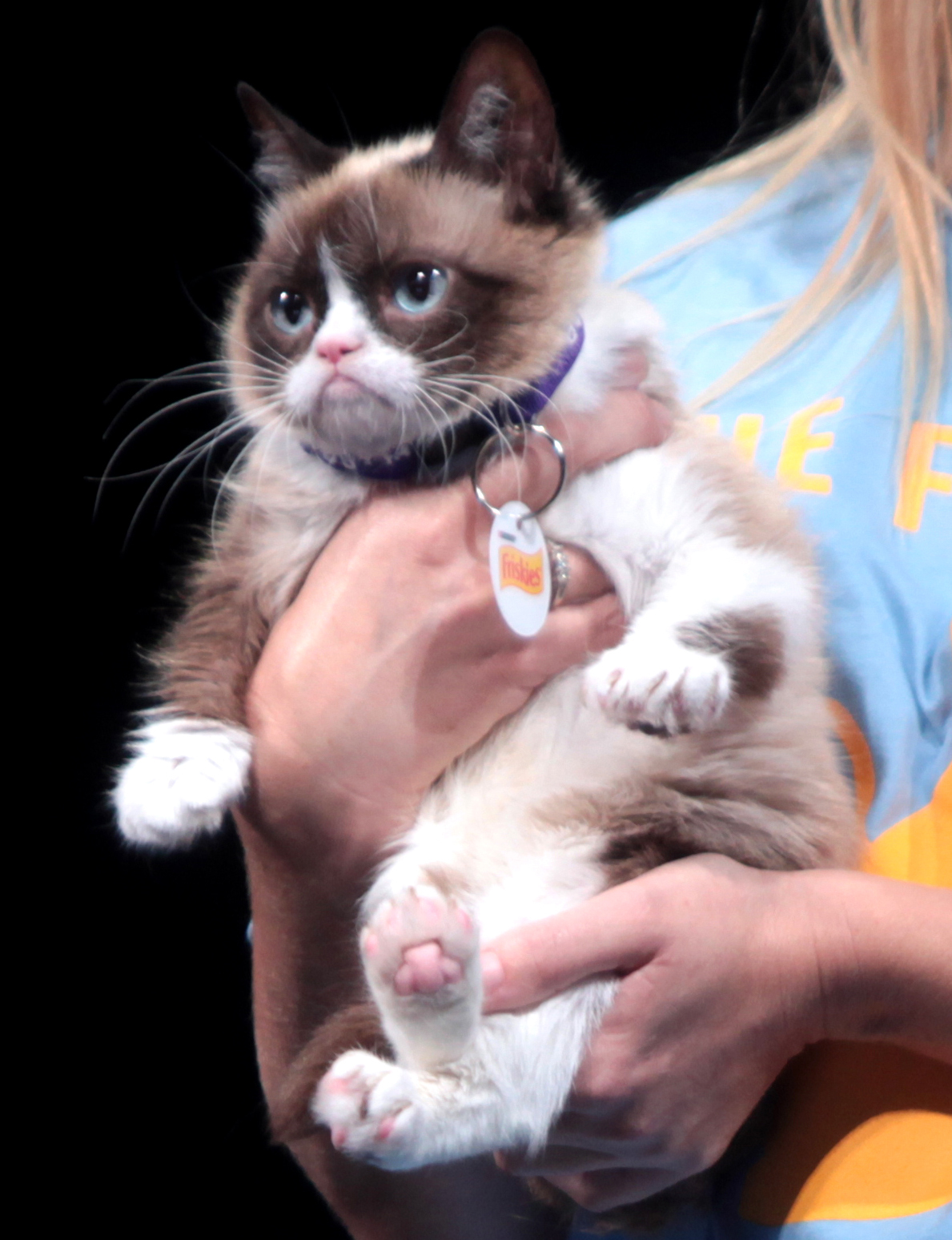
Grumpy Cat (aka Tardar Sauce), a Friskies spokescat

The first Friskies spokesperson and spokespet were Father Bernard Hubbard (aka "The Glacier Priest") and one of his sled dogs, named Katmai, in the mid-1930s. Hubbard was a popular lecturer, sharing stories of his travels to the then largely unexplored Alaska territory.

Starting in 2011, Friskies has been developing digital games for cats on mobile devices that are played using touch-screens. Some of its early games included Cat Fishing, JitterBug and Pull 'n Play, which each focused on chasing moving targets on the screen.

According to Adweek, Friskies "jumped on the cat Internet meme phenomena." The internet celebrity cat, Grumpy Cat (also known as Tardar Sauce), became a Friskies spokescat in 2013 after having been featured in episodes of the Friskies YouTube game show "Will Kitty Play With It?" That same year, Friskies created a series of four Henri, le Chat Noir short films on the subject of "cat food boredom" and several internet celebrity cats were used in a Christmas music video called "It's Hard to Be a Cat at Christmas.”

In 2014, Friskies created a satire in partnership with The Fine Bros., whereby they filmed reaction videos of cats watching web series' created by Friskies. Later that same year, Friskies started "The Friskies 50,” a list of the most influential internet cats. The list is based on the cat's audience and engagement on social media sites, media coverage and other factors. Users can also input a cat name to see how cats that did not make the list compare. At the 2015 South by Southwest Interactive festival, Friskies promoted its bacon-flavored cat food with a bacon/cat-themed art gallery, some of which were constructed using Friskies products and bacon. In 2016, Friskies worked with BuzzFeed to create "Dear Kitten" videos, where an older cat teaches a younger one how to be a house-cat. The series had more than 30 million views. A sixty-second spot based on the series was aired during the Super Bowl, which was the first time Friskies aired a television commercial during the event.

== Products ==
Friskies-brand products include dry food, canned wet food and treats for cats. According to the Friskies website, there are more than 50 variations of Friskies cat food. There are five dry food flavors sold in bags, including "Seafood Sensations" and "Grillers." Wet foods are sold in various flavors, such as chicken or seafood, and in vacuum bags or cans. The Tasty Treasures canned wet food has cheese and bacon flavors. SauceSations canned wet food is mixed with sauces. There are also pouches of Friskies Party Mix treats, and "Pull 'n Play" treats that are edible tender strings. In 2003, the Friskies brand was re-launched with new packaging. By this time, Friskies was the largest market-share holder in the cat food segment, with a 60 percent share of the wet food market and 49.3 percent share for dry food.
