= Cats and the internet =

Cats are a popular part of the internet

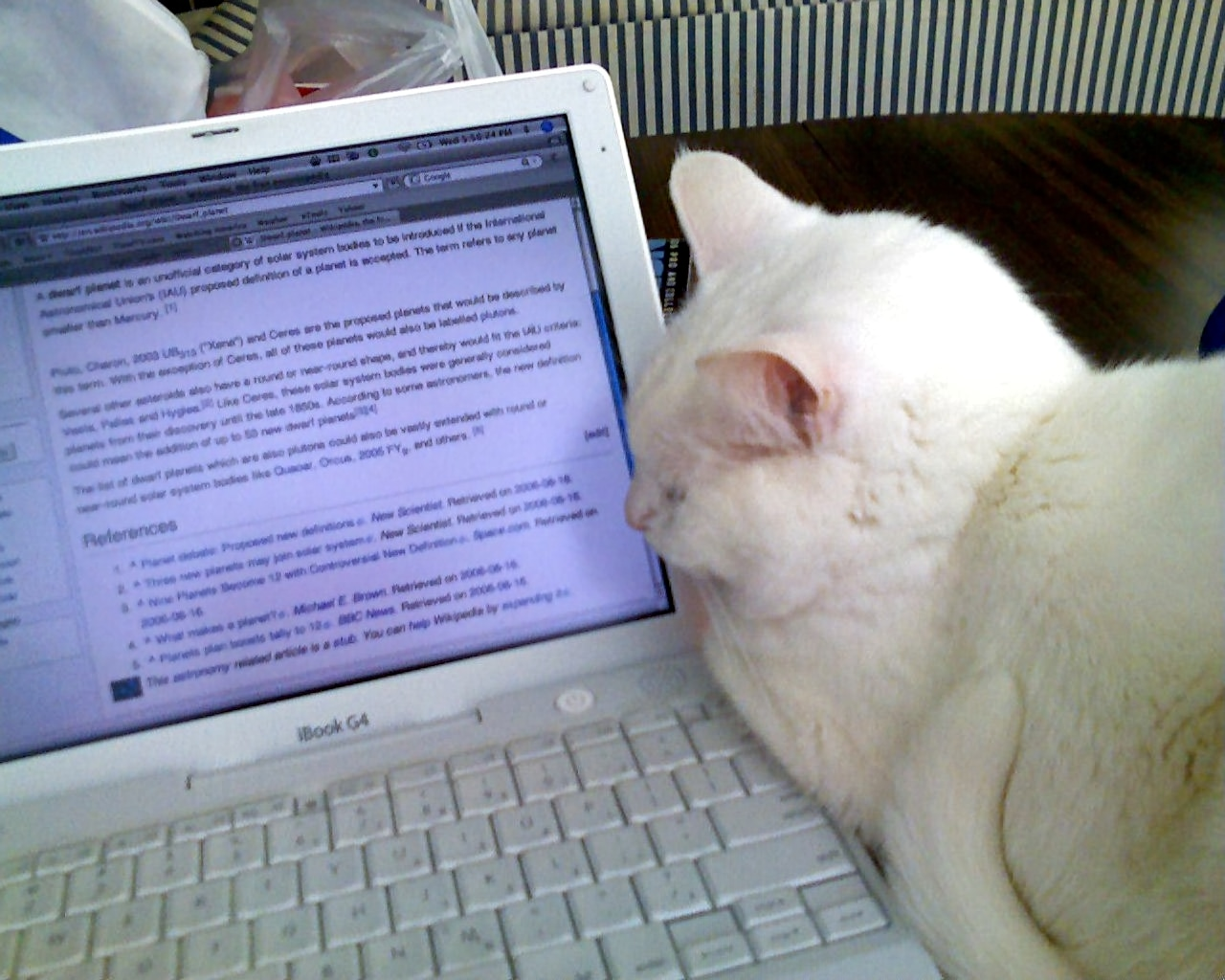
A white cat viewing the Wikipedia article "Dwarf planet"

Images, videos and memes of domestic cats make up some of the most viewed media on the World Wide Web. Cats have been shared via email since the internet's rise to prominence in the 1990s.

The subject has attracted the attention of various scholars and critics, who have analysed why this subject has reached iconic status. Although it may be considered frivolous, cat-related internet content contributes to how people interact with media and culture. Some argue that there is a depth and complexity to this seemingly simple content, with a suggestion that the positive psychological effects that pets have on their owners also hold true for cat images viewed online.

Some individual cats, such as Grumpy Cat and Lil Bub, have achieved popularity online because of their unusual appearances, that are considered humorous by internet users. Various popular internet memes have been produced about cats.

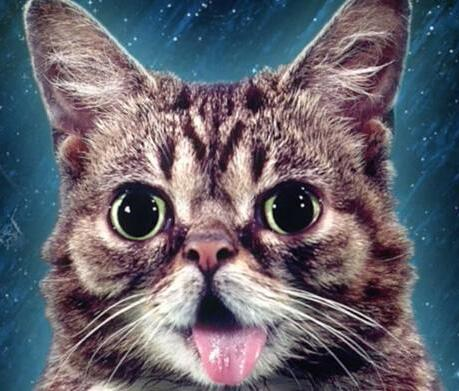
Lil Bub in 2013

== History ==
Cats have been shared via email since the internet's rise to prominence in the 1990s. The New York Times described cat images as "that essential building block of the Internet". In addition, 2,594,329 cat images had been manually annotated on Flickr by users. An interesting phenomenon is that many photograph owners tag their house cats as "tiger". In 2011, Thought Catalog described cats as the "unofficial mascot of the Internet".

Humans have a longstanding relationship with cats, and the animals have often been a subject of short films, including the early silent movies Boxing Cats (1894) by Thomas Edison and The Sick Kitten (1903). Harry Pointer (1822–1889) has been cited as the "progenitor of the shameless cat picture".

The first cat video on YouTube is Pajamas and Nick Drake, uploaded on May 22, 2005, by YouTube co-founder Steve Chen under the username "steve". The 30-second video shows Chen's since deceased black cat named Pajamas playing with some black rope supposedly controlled by Steve Chen in a room dimly-lit by an orange lightbulb while Hazey Jane II by Nick Drake plays in the background. As of July 11, 2026, it has approximately 1,250,000 views. Not much else is known about Pajamas.

In 2006, Puppy vs Cat became the first viral cat video, uploaded by user Sanchey (a.k.a. Michael Wienzek); as of 2015 it had over 16,000,000 views on YouTube. In a Mashable article that explored the history of cat media on the internet, the oldest entry was an ASCII art cat that originated on 2channel, and was a pictorial representation of the phrase "Please go away." The oldest continuously operating cat website is sophie.net, which launched in October 1999 and is still operating.

Eric Nakagawa and Kari Unebasami started the website I Can Haz Cheezburger in 2007, where they shared funny pictures of cats. This site allowed users to create LOLcat memes by placing writing on top of pictures of their cats. By 2015, the site had more than 100 million views per month and had "created a whole new form of internet speak". In 2009, the humour site Urlesque deemed September 9 "A Day Without Cats Online", and had over 40 blogs and websites agree to "[ban] cats from their pages for at least 24 hours". As of 2015, there are over 2 million cat videos on YouTube alone, and cats are one of the most searched keywords on the internet. CNN estimated that in 2015 there could be around 6.5 billion cat pictures on the internet. The internet has been described as a "virtual cat park, a social space for cat lovers in the same way that dog lovers congregate at a dog park". The Daily Telegraph deemed Nyan Cat the most popular internet cat, while NPR gave this title to Grumpy Cat. The Daily Telegraph also deemed the best cat video on YouTube as "Surprised Kitty (Original)", which currently has over 75 million views. BuzzFeed deemed Cattycake the most important cat of 2010.

In 2015, an exhibition called "How Cats Took Over The Internet" opened at the Museum of the Moving Image in New York. The exhibition "looks at the history of how they rose to internet fame, and why people like them so much". There is even a book entitled How to Make Your Cat an Internet Celebrity: A Guide to Financial Freedom. The annual Internet Cat Video Festival celebrated and awards the Golden Kitty to cat videos. According to Star Tribune, the festival's success is because "people realized that the cat video they'd chuckled over in the privacy of their homes was suddenly a thousand times funnier when there are thousands of other people around". The Daily Telegraph had an entire article devoted to International Cat Day. EMGN wrote an article entitled "21 Reasons Why Cats And The Internet Are A Match Made in Heaven".

In 2015, there were more than 2 million cat videos on YouTube, with an average of 12,000 views each – a higher average than any other category of YouTube content. Cats made up 16% of views in YouTube's "Pets & Animals" category, compared to dogs' 23%. The YouTube video Cats vs. Zombies merged the two internet phenomena of cats and zombies. Data from BuzzFeed and Tumblr has shown that dog videos have more views than those of cats, and less than 1% of posts on Reddit mention cats. While dogs are searched for much more than cats, there is less content on the internet. The Facebook page "Cats" has over 2 million likes while Dogs has over 6.5 million. In an internet tradition, The New York Times Archives X account posts cat reporting throughout the history of the NYT. The Japanese prefecture of Hiroshima launched an online Cat Street View, which showed the region from the perspective of a cat.

Abigail Tucker, author of The Lion in the Living Room, a history of domestic cats, has suggested that cats appeal particularly because they "remind us of our own faces, and especially of our babies ... [they're] strikingly human but also perpetually deadpan".

== Psychology ==
Cats and the internet as a subject has attracted the attention of various scholars and critics, who have analysed why this subject has reached iconic status. Although it may be considered frivolous, cat-related internet content contributes to how people interact with media and culture. Some argue that there is a depth and complexity to this seemingly simple content, with a suggestion that the positive psychological effects that pets have on their owners also hold true for cat images viewed online. Research has suggested that viewing online cat media is related to positive emotions, and that it even may work as a form of digital therapy or stress relief for some users. Some elements of research also show that feelings of guilt when postponing tasks can be reduced by viewing cat content.

Jason Eppink, curator of the Museum of the Moving Image's show How Cats Took Over the Internet, has noted the "outsized role" of cats on the internet. Wired magazine felt that the cuteness of cats was "too simplistic" an explanation of their popularity online.

A scientific survey found that the participants were happier after watching cat videos. The researcher behind the survey explained "If we want to better understand the effects the Internet may have on us as individuals and on society, then researchers can't ignore Internet cats anymore" and "consumption of online cat-related media deserves empirical attention". The Huffington Post suggested that the videos were a form of procrastination, with most being watched while at work or ostensibly studying, while IU Bloomington commented "[it] does more than simply entertain; it boosts viewers' energy and positive emotions and decreases negative feelings". Business Insider argues "This falls in line with a body of research regarding the effects that animals have on people." A 2015 study by Jessica Gall Myrick found that people were more than twice as likely to post a picture or video of a cat to the internet than they were to post a selfie.

Maria Bustillos considers cat videos to be "the crystallisation of all that human beings love about cats", with their "natural beauty and majesty" being "just one tiny slip away from total humiliation", which Bustillos sees as a mirror of the human condition. When the creator of the World Wide Web, Tim Berners-Lee, was asked for an example of a popular use of the internet that he would never have predicted, he answered, "Kittens". A 2014 paper argues that cats' "unselfconsciousness" is rare in an age of hyper-surveillance, and cat photos appeal to people as it lets them imagine "the possibility of freedom from surveillance", while presenting the power of controlling that surveillance as unproblematic. Time magazine felt that cat images tap into viewers nature as "secret voyeurs".

The Cheezburger Network considers cats to be the "perfect canvas" for human emotion, as they have expressive facial and body aspects. Mashable offered "cats' cuteness, non-cuteness, popularity among geeks, blank canvas qualities, personality issues, and the fact that dogs just don't have 'it'" as possible explanations to cats' popularity on the internet. A paper entitled ""I Can Haz Emoshuns?" – Understanding Anthropomorphosis of Cats among Internet Users" found that Tagpuss, an app that showed users cat images and asked them to choose their emotion "can be used to identify cat behaviours that lay-people find difficult to distinguish".

Jason Eppink, curator of the "How Cats Took Over the Internet" exhibition, explained: "People on the web are more likely to post a cat than another animal, because it sort of perpetuates itself. It becomes a self-fulfilling prophesy. [sic]" Jason Kottke considers cats to be "easier to objectify" and therefore "easier to make fun of". Journalist Jack Shepherd suggested that cats were more popular than dogs because dogs were "trying too hard", and humorous behavior in a dog would be seen as a bid for validation. Shepherd sees cats' behavior as being "cool, and effortless, and devoid of any concern about what you might think about it. It is art for art's sake".

Cats have historically been associated with magic, and have been revered by various human cultures, the ancient Egyptians worshipping them as gods and the creatures being feared as demons in ancient Japan, such as the bakeneko. Vogue magazine has suggested that the popularity of cats on the internet is culturally-specific, being popular in North America, Western Europe, and Japan. Other nations favor different animals online, Ugandans sharing images of goats and chickens, Mexicans preferring llamas, and Chinese internet users sharing images of the river crab and grass-mud horse due to double-meanings of their names allowing them to "subvert government Internet censors".

=== Cute cat theory of digital activism ===
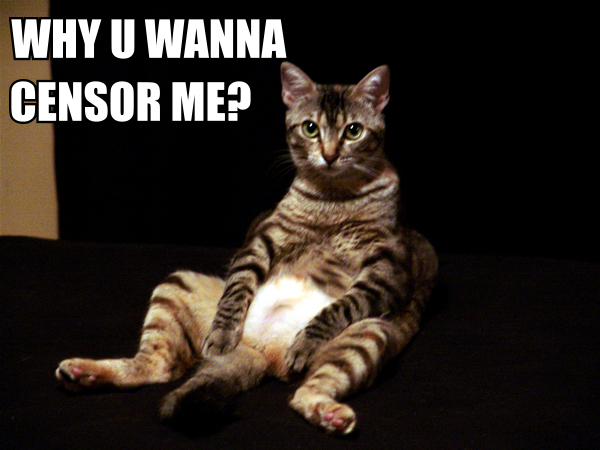
Lolcat images are often shared through the same networks used by online activists.

The cute cat theory of digital activism is a theory concerning internet activism, internet censorship, and "cute cats" (a term used for any low-value, but popular online activity) developed by Ethan Zuckerman in 2008. It posits that most people are not interested in activism; instead, they want to use the web for mundane activities, including surfing for pornography and lolcats ("cute cats"). The tools that they develop for that (such as Facebook, Flickr, Blogger, Twitter, and similar platforms) are very useful to social movement activists, who may lack resources to develop dedicated tools themselves. This, in turn, makes the activists more immune to reprisals by governments than if they were using a dedicated activism platform, because shutting down a popular public platform provokes a larger public outcry than shutting down an obscure one.

== Celebrities ==
Because of the relative newness of this industry, most owners of famous cats found themselves stumbling into internet stardom without intentionally planning it.

=== Uni ===
Uni is a minuet cat from Japan, and has around 700k followers on YouTube known for his cuddly nature and emoticon like mouth.

=== Grumpy Cat ===
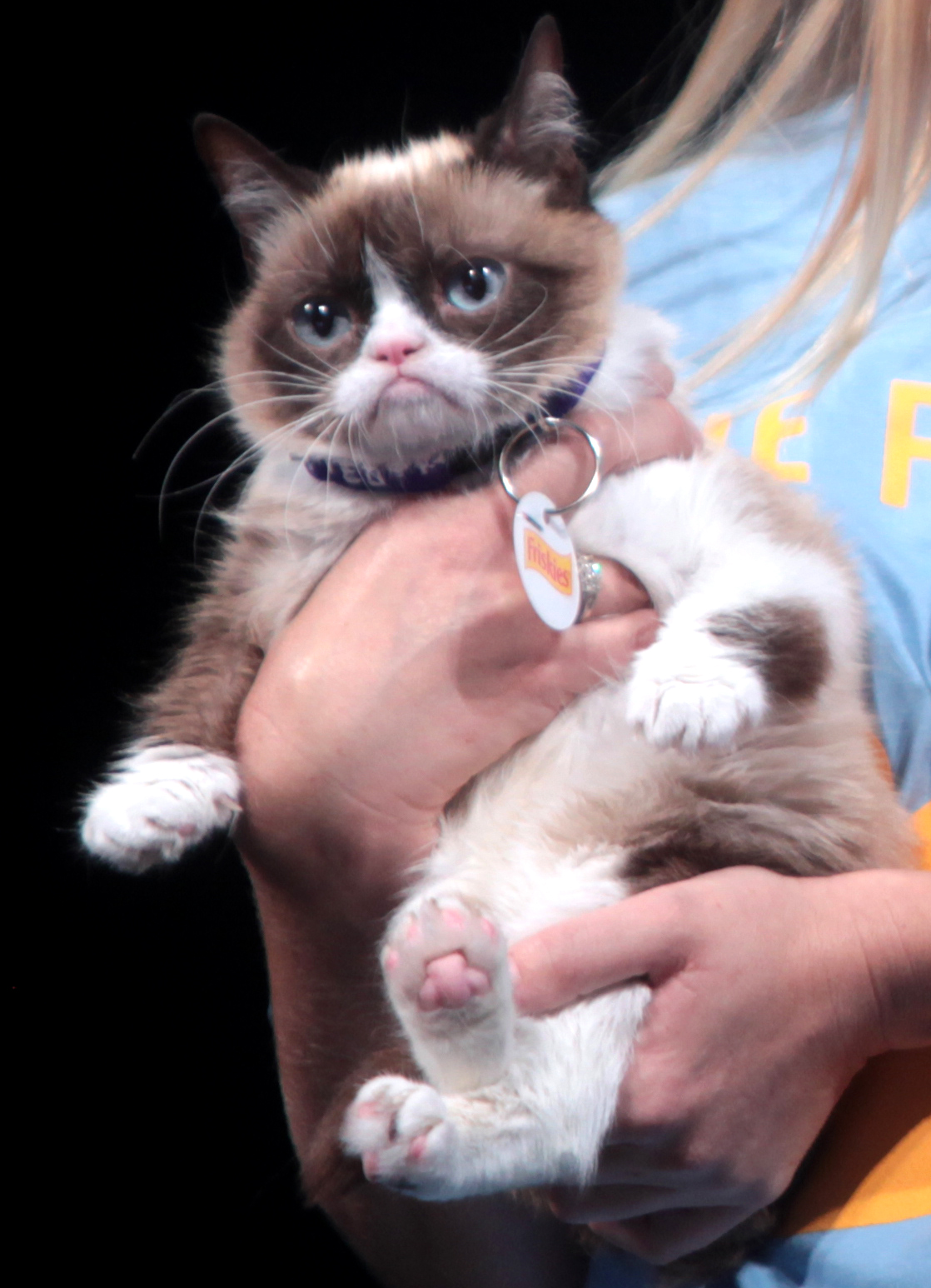
Grumpy Cat, a pet made famous through an image macro, on stage at VidCon 2014

Tardar Sauce (born April 4, 2012 – May 14, 2019), better known by her internet name "Grumpy Cat", was a cat and internet celebrity known for her grumpy facial expression. Her owner, Tabatha Bundesen, says that her permanently grumpy-looking face was due to an underbite and feline dwarfism. Grumpy Cat's popularity originated from a picture posted to Reddit by Bundesen's brother Bryan on September 22, 2012. It was made into an image macro with grumpy captions. As of December 10, 2014, "The Official Grumpy Cat" page on Facebook has over 7 million likes. Grumpy Cat was featured on the front page of The Wall Street Journal on May 30, 2013, and on the cover of New York magazine on October 7, 2013. In August 2015 it was announced that Grumpy Cat would get her own animatronic waxwork at Madame Tussauds in San Francisco. The Huffington Post wrote an article exploring America's fascination with cats.

=== Lil Bub ===
Lil Bub (Lillian Bubbles) (June 21, 2011 – December 1, 2019) was an American celebrity cat known for her unique appearance. She was the runt of her litter. Her owner, Mike Bridavsky, adopted her when his friends called to ask him to give her a home. Her photos were first posted to Tumblr in November 2011 then taken off after being featured on Reddit. "Lil Bub" on Facebook has over two million likes. Lil Bub stars in Lil Bub & Friendz, a documentary premiered at the Tribeca Film Festival on April 18, 2013, that won the Tribeca Online Festival Best Feature Film.

=== Maru ===
Maru (まる, Japanese: circle or round) (May 24, 2007 – September 6, 2025) was a male Scottish Fold (straight variety) cat in Japan who became popular on YouTube. As of September 2025, videos with Maru have been viewed over 578 million times. Videos featuring Maru have an average of 800,000 views each, and he is mentioned often in print and televised media discussing internet celebrities. Maru has been dubbed "the most famous cat on the internet."

Maru's owner posts videos under the account name 'mugumogu'. His owner is almost never seen in the videos. (Note: although the video titled Maru's ear cleaning is an exception.) The videos include title cards in English and Japanese setting up and describing the events, and often show Maru playing in cardboard boxes, indicated by "I love a box!" in his first video.

=== Colonel Meow ===
Colonel Meow (adopted October 11, 2011 (Note: According to the owners, October 11, 2011, is not the cat's birth date, but the date of his adoption; his birth date is unknown.) – January 29, 2014) was a male Himalayan–Persian crossbreed cat, who holds the 2014 Guinness world record for the longest fur on a cat (9 in (230 mm)). He became an internet celebrity when his owners posted pictures of his scowling face to Facebook and Instagram. He was known by his hundreds of thousands of followers as an "adorable fearsome dictator", a "prodigious Scotch drinker" and "the angriest cat in the world".

=== Cole and Marmalade ===
Cole (c. March 1, 2012 – October 10, 2021) and Marmalade (July 13, 2013 – October 10, 2026) were a pair of adopted internet celebrity cats that gained popularity on social media platforms like YouTube and Facebook for video and photo contents that were a mix of entertainment towards cat lovers and education and awareness-raising for shelter animals among other cat-related topics.

=== Oh Long Johnson ===
This unnamed cat was featured in the first place-winning video "Cat's Got a Tongue" from Season 10, Episode 20 of America's Funniest Home Videos. In the video, the cat makes aggressive noises at another. The noises sound like human words and phrases such as "Oh my dog", "Oh Long John", "Oh Long Johnson", "Oh Don piano", "Why I eyes ya", "All the live long day", and "Oh that long long Johnson". " The video first appeared on the internet in 2006 during a compilation video on YouTube featuring cats producing human-like sounds, and other standalone videos were later uploaded. The full clip shows a second, younger-looking cat in the room.

By 2012, the video of the cat had been viewed 6.5 million times. The clip was included in the 2019 Cat Video Fest which was held at the Vancity Theatre in Vancouver on April 20. There were to be five consecutive screenings of the videos.

The video was referenced in the South Park episode "Faith Hilling".

=== Jorts ===
Jorts is an office cat that was the centre of a December 2021 dispute between staff. Self-reporting of the dispute on a subreddit of Reddit attracted significant attention.

=== Brünnhilde ===
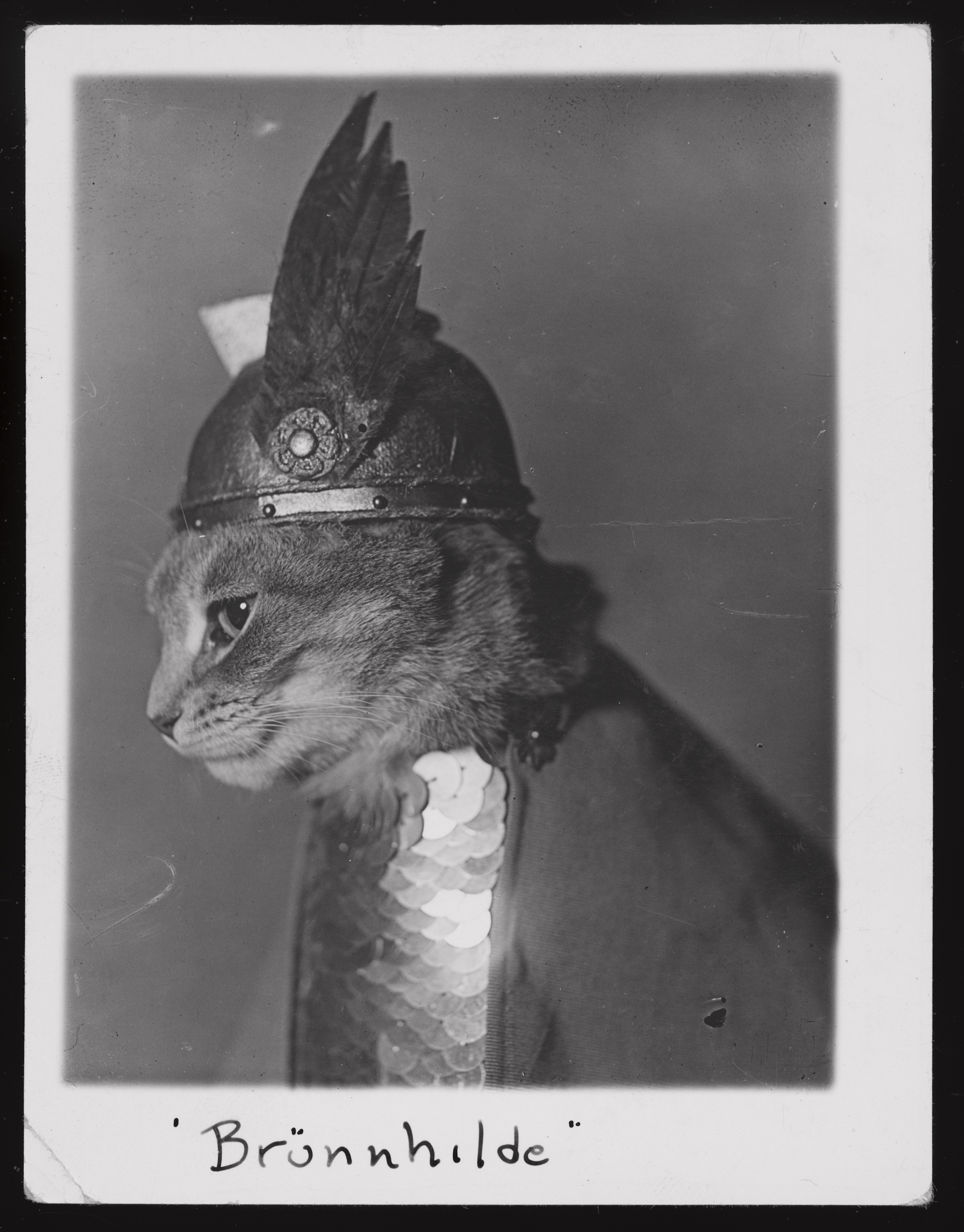
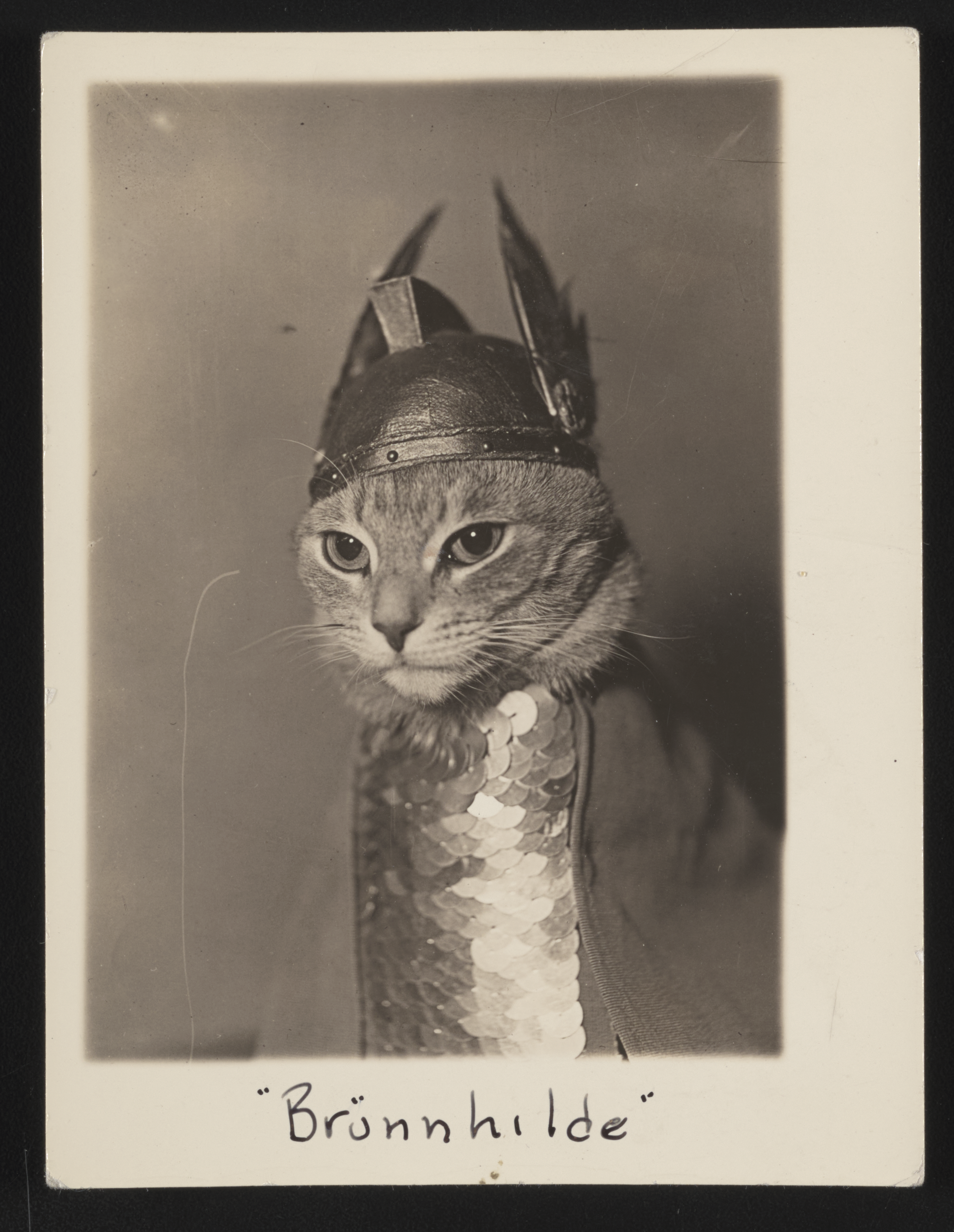
Both photographs of Brünnhilde in 1936

Brünnhilde was a female tabby cat known from two 1936 photographs of her wearing a costume of her namesake from Der Ring des Nibelungen, an opera cycle by Richard Wagner. She became notable in 2022 for her inclusion in Not an Ostrich: & Other Images from America's Library, an exhibit of historical photographs hosted by the United States Library of Congress.

Brünnhilde was adopted as a stray by Adolph Edward Weidhaas. He took two photographs of her in costume, wearing miniature scale armor and a winged helmet. The photographs were displayed as advertisements at the Snapshot Store, a photography store in New York City. Both photographs are now in the collection of the Library of Congress. Initially, only one of the photographs (Brünnhilde in profile) was available online; the Library of Congress described it as "one of [their] most beloved free-to-use photos". In January 2023, the Library of Congress digitized the second photograph, showing Brünnhilde from the front, and released it on Twitter, at which point it went viral. The Associated Press observed the similarity of Brünnhilde's photographs to many modern comedic cat photographs, saying that "at least one aspect of photography hasn't changed much in 150 years".

=== Belle (Clone Kitty) ===
Belle (born 2021), better known by her internet name Clone Kitty, is a cat and internet celebrity recognized as the most well-known cloned cat on social media. Cloned from her owner's late cat, Chai, Belle's story has attracted global attention for its emotional, scientific, and ethical dimensions, sparking widespread discussions about pet cloning.

Belle has been featured in major international media outlets including Good Morning America, The Washington Post, and the BBC, which have covered her unique bond with her owner and the ethical questions surrounding pet cloning.

== Internet memes ==
Cat-related internet content contributes to how people interact with media and culture.

=== Lolcat ===
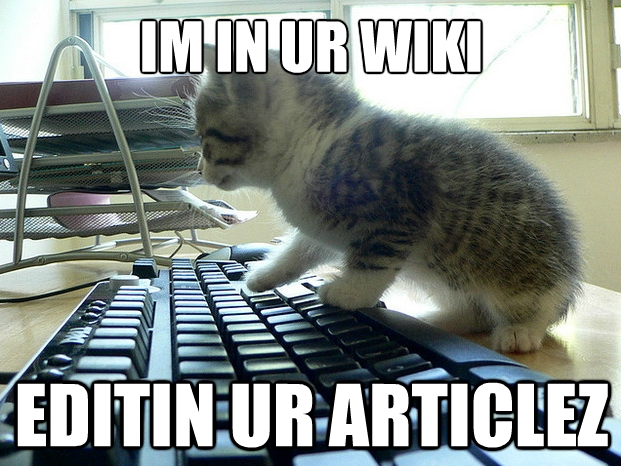
A lolcat image

A lolcat (pronounced /ˈlɒlkæt/ LOL-kat) is an image macro of one or more cats. The image's text is often idiosyncratic and grammatically incorrect. Its use in this way is known as "lolspeak" or "kitty pidgin".

"Lolcat" is a compound word of the acronymic abbreviation for "laugh out loud" (LOL) and the word "cat". A synonym for "lolcat" is cat macro, since the images are a type of image macro. Lolcats are commonly designed for photo sharing imageboards and other internet forums.

=== Nyan Cat ===
Nyan Cat is the name of a YouTube video, uploaded in April 2011, which became an internet meme. The video merged a Japanese pop song "Nyanyanyanyanyanyanya!" with an animated cartoon cat with the body of a Pop-Tart, flying through space, and leaving a rainbow trail behind it. The video ranked at number 5 on the list of most viewed YouTube videos in 2011.

=== Keyboard Cat ===
Keyboard Cat is another internet phenomenon. It consists of a video from 1984 of Fatso, a cat wearing a blue shirt and appearing to play an upbeat rhythm on an electronic keyboard. The video was posted to YouTube under the title "charlie schmidt's cool cats" in June 2007. Schmidt later changed the title to "Charlie Schmidt's Keyboard Cat (The Original)".

Fatso (who died in 1987) was owned (and manipulated in the video) by Charlie Schmidt of Spokane, Washington, US, and the blue shirt still belonged to Schmidt's cat Fatso. Later, Brad O'Farrell, who was the syndication manager of the video website My Damn Channel, obtained Schmidt's permission to reuse the footage, appending it to the end of a blooper video to "play" that person offstage after the mistake or gaffe in a similar manner as getting the hook in the days of vaudeville. The appending of Schmidt's video to other blooper and other viral videos became popular, with such videos usually accompanied with the title Play Him Off, Keyboard Cat or a variant. "Keyboard Cat" was ranked No. 2 on Current TV's list of 50 Greatest Viral Videos.

In 2009, Schmidt became owner of Bento, another cat that resembled Fatso, and which he used to create new Keyboard Cat videos, until Bento's death in March 2018. Schmidt has adopted a new cat "Skinny" or "Keyboard Cat 3.0", which has yet to become popular.

=== Cats that Look Like Hitler ===
Cats That Look Like Hitler is a satirical website featuring photographs of cats that bear an alleged resemblance to Adolf Hitler. Most of the cats have a large black splotch underneath their nose, much like Hitler's stumpy toothbrush moustache. The site was founded by Koos Plegt and Paul Neve in 2006, and became widely known after being featured on several television programmes across Europe and Australia. The site is now only run by Neve. As of February 2013, the site contained photographs of over 8,000 cats, submitted by owners with digital cameras and internet access and then approved by Neve as content.

=== Everytime you masturbate... God kills a kitten ===
"Every time you masturbate... God kills a kitten" is the caption of an image created by a member of the website Fark in 2002. The image features a kitten (subsequently referred to as "Cliché Kitty") being chased by two Domos, and has the tagline "Please, think of the kittens".

=== I Can Has Cheezburger ===
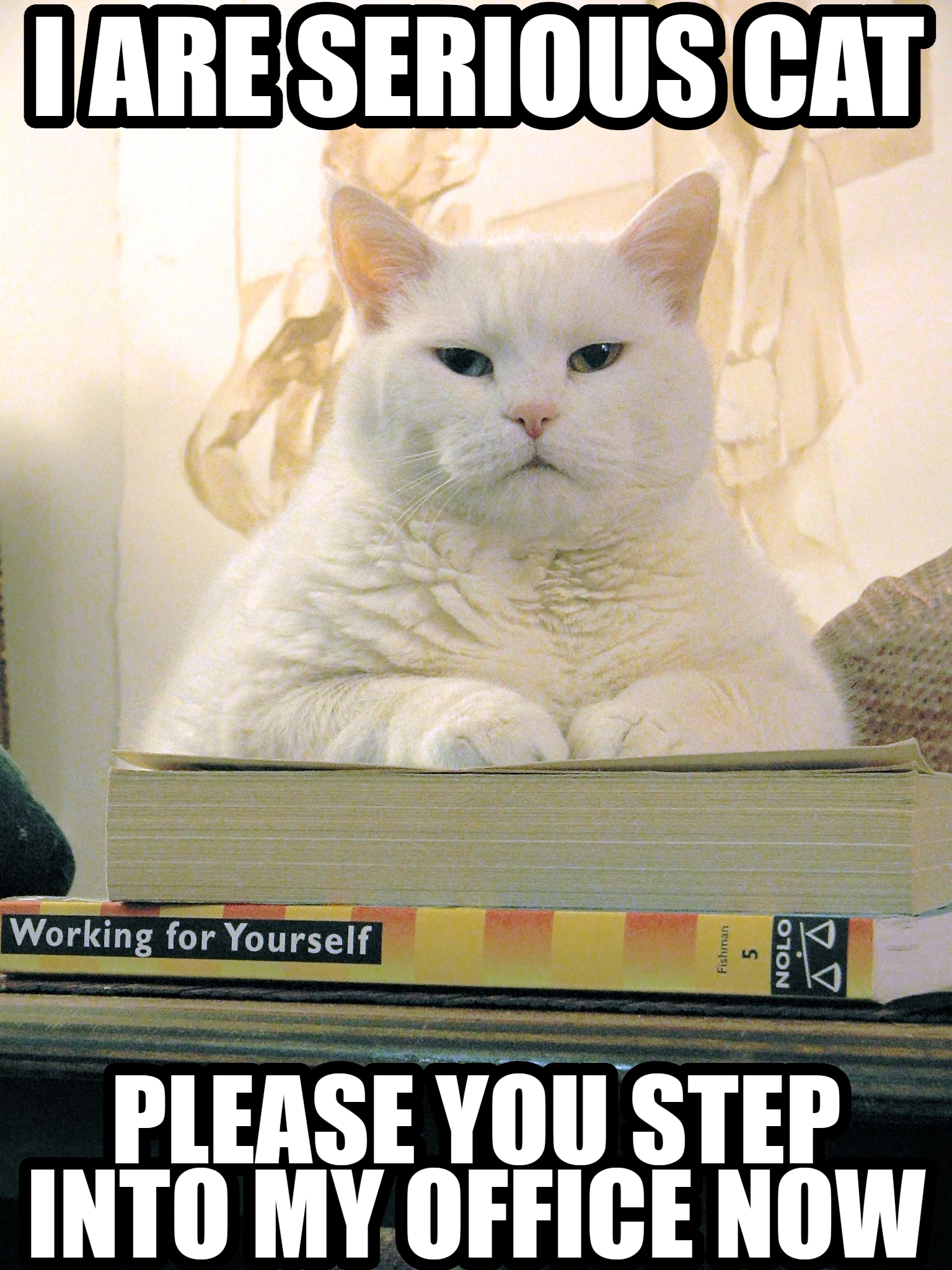
An image posted on I Can Has Cheezburger

I Can Has Cheezburger was created in 2007 by Eric Nakagawa (Cheezburger), a blogger from Hawaii, and his friend Kari Unebasami (Tofuburger). The website is one of the most popular internet sites of its kind. It received as many as 1,500,000 hits per day at its peak in May 2007. ICHC was instrumental in bringing animal-based image macros and lolspeak into mainstream usage and making internet memes profitable.

=== Brussels lockdown ===
In 2015, the atmosphere among the community of Brussels, Belgium was tense when the city was put under the highest level state of emergency immediately following the Paris attacks; however, internet cats were able to cut the tension by taking over the Twitter feed #BrusselsLockdown. The feed was designed to discuss operational details of terrorist raids, but when police asked for a social media blackout the hashtag was overwhelmed by internet users posting pictures of cats to drown out serious discussion and prevent terrorists from gaining any useful information. The use of cat images is a reference to the Level 4 state of emergency: the French word for the number 4, quatre, is pronounced similarly to the word "cat" in English.

=== Pusheen ===
Pusheen is another internet phenomenon about a cartoon cat. Created in 2010 by Claire Belton, the popularity of using emoji and Facebook stickers led to a rise in Pusheen's popularity. She now has 9 million followers.

=== Bongo Cat ===
Bongo Cat is another internet meme about a cartoon cat that originated on May 7, 2018, when an animated cat gif made by Twitter user "@StrayRogue" was edited by Twitter user "@DitzyFlama" to include bongos and the music "Athletic" from the Super Mario World soundtrack. This cat has since been edited to many other songs, and many different instruments.

=== Peepee the Cat ===
Peepee the cat was the star of a copypasta popularized on Twitter. The post, "i Amn just........... a litle creacher. Thatse It . I Canot change this" was posted on September 18, 2018, and has garnered over 38,000 likes.

=== Vibing Cat/CatJam ===
In April 2020, a video of a white cat from Québec, Canada named Minette bobbing her head as if dancing went viral. In addition to its popularity on social media sites like YouTube and TikTok, the cat was widely shared on livestreaming platform Twitch.tv, where it was enabled as an emote through third-party service BetterTTV on over 200,000 channels. In December 2020, the official YouTube Channel of the International Cricket Council posted a video named "Vibing cricketers, vibing cat" showing edited footage of the cat alongside various cricketers dancing to music.

=== Zoom Cat Lawyer/I'm Not a Cat ===
"Zoom Cat Lawyer", also known as "I'm Not a Cat", refers to a viral video taken from a livestream of a civil forfeiture hearing being held over the video conferencing application Zoom in Texas' 394th Judicial District Court. The video features attorney Rod Ponton, who is struggling to disable a cat filter that shows a white kitten mask over his face, resulting in it appearing as if a cat is speaking.

=== Floppa ===
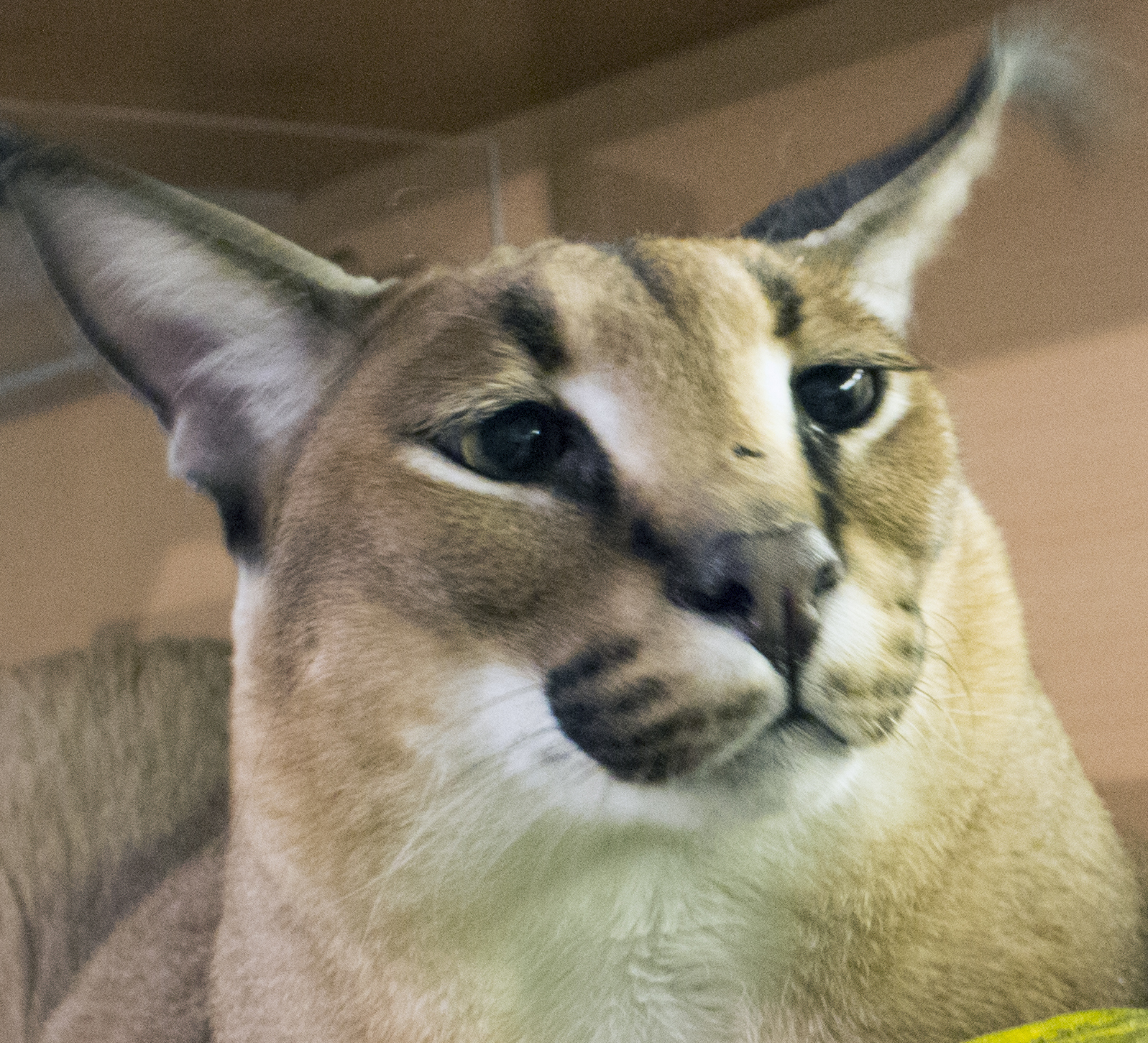
Big Floppa

Big Floppa is a caracal from Russia (real name Gregory or Gosha for short) who gained popularity as an internet meme after being posted by his owner on Instagram. Floppa can also more generally refer to a collection of images either portraying Big Floppa (also referred to as Gosha or Shlepa) or any caracals. The collection of images do not portray to a specific theme per se, but always hold Floppa as a centerpoint or personification of something.

=== Catloaf ===
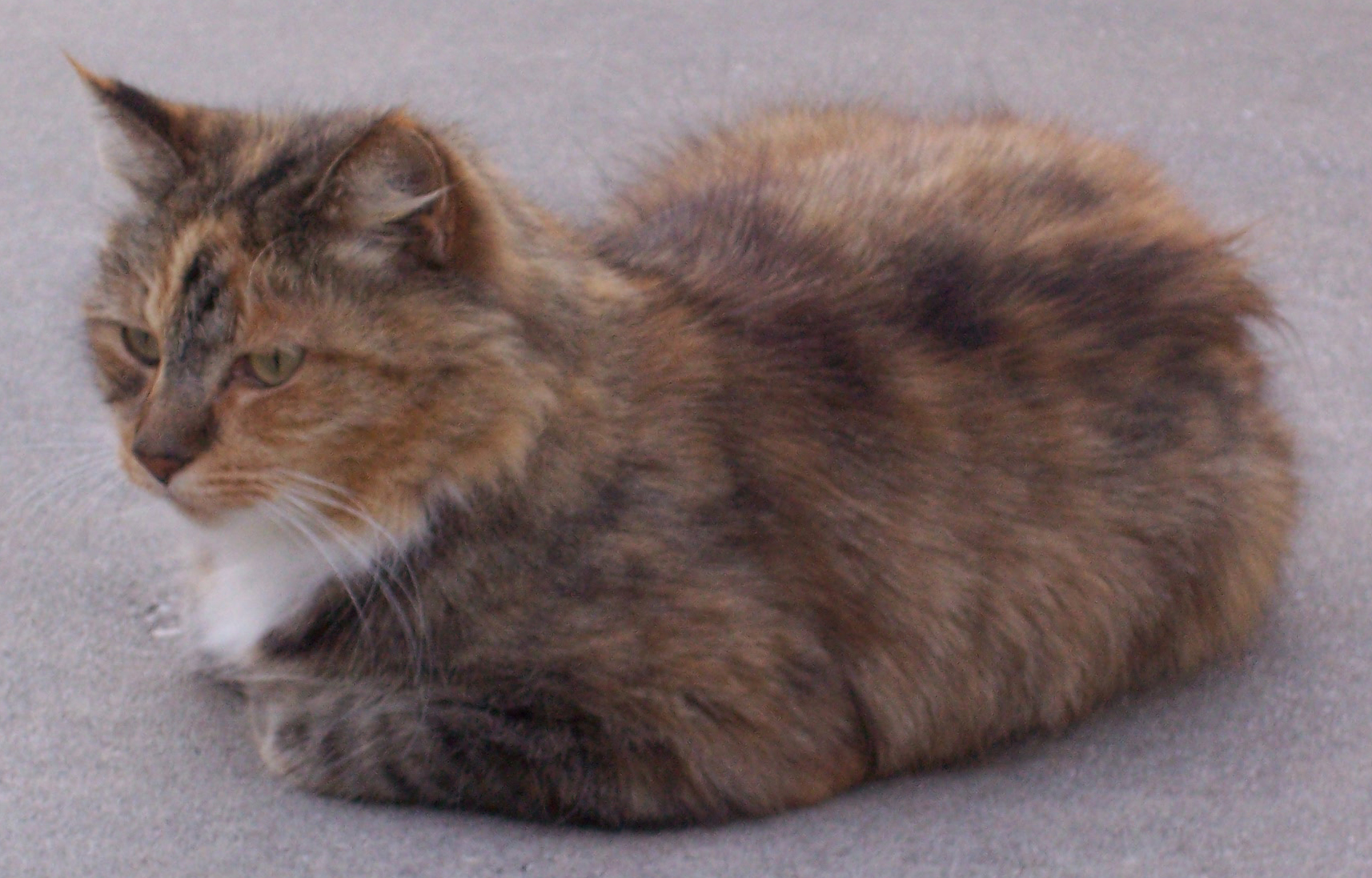
A cat "loafing" with its paws and tail tucked under its body

Catloaf (also spelled as cat loaf/cat-loaf and sometimes known as hovercat, tugboat or loafing) is a term used to describe a cat's sitting position in which its paws and tail are tucked under the body, forming a loaf-like shape. It is speculated that the cat is relaxed and feels safe, and therefore has no need to sit in a position where it would have to attack. Another potential reason for this sitting position is for the cat to maintain a comfortable body temperature without having to move.

American cartoonist B. Kliban had noted the similarity between the shapes of cats and meatloaves as early as 1975. However, widespread popularity of the word had not gained peak popularity until the 2010s on social media sites such as Reddit and Twitter, as well as Facebook, where the sitting position is also known as "tugboat" in the "Tuggin'" group.

=== Cat Breading ===
Cat breading (also known as "Breading Cats") is an internet meme that involves cutting a hole in the center of a slice of bread and then putting the bread around a cat's neck.

=== Cat walking on the Han River ===
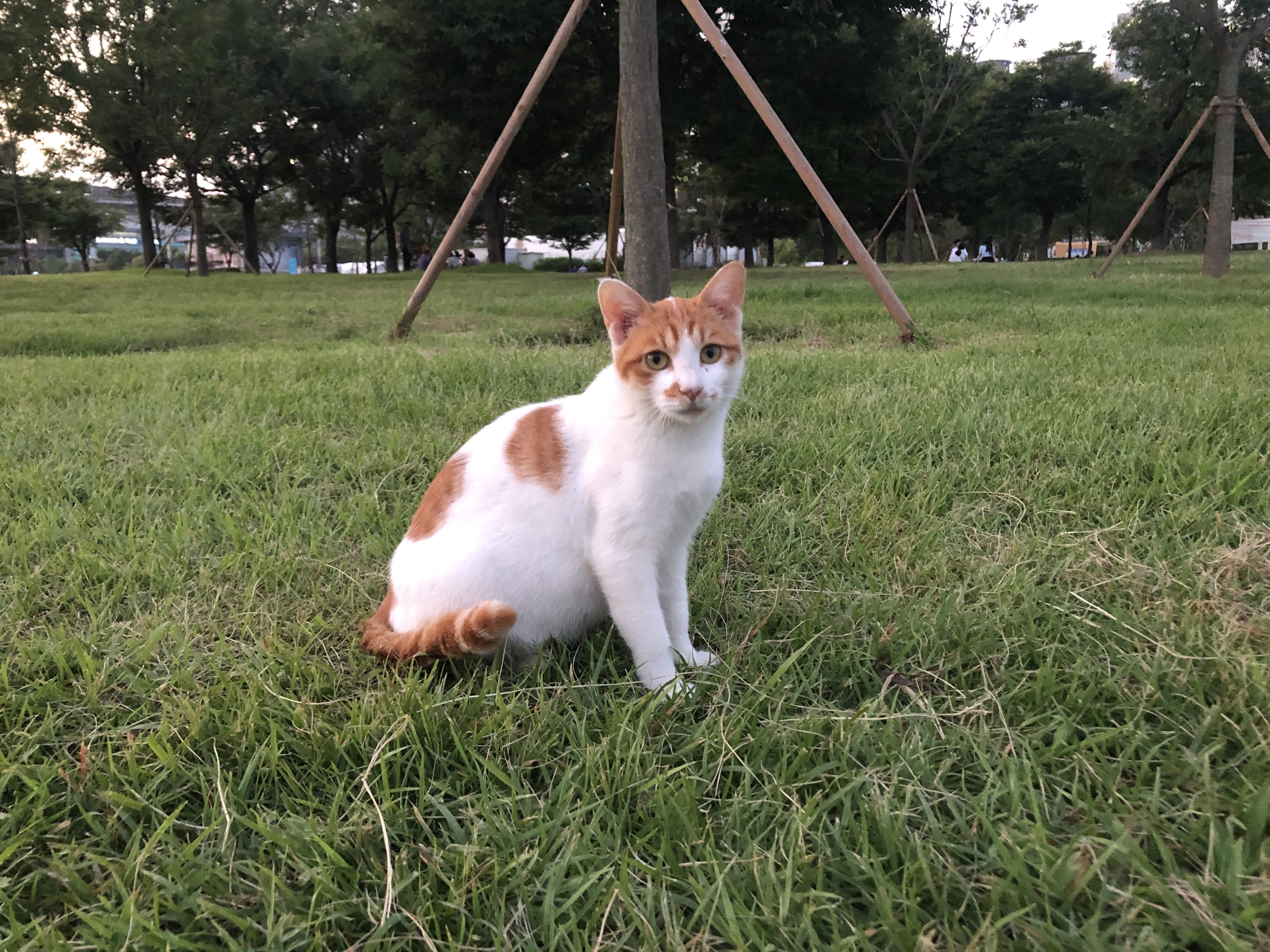
Kkongkkong, subject of the South Korean internet meme "cat walking on the Han River"

In South Korea, a 2021 news report's mention of a cat walking on the frozen Han River in Seoul became a meme in 2022. In the video, a reporter says the phrase "꽁꽁 얼어붙은 한강 위로 고양이가 걸어 다닙니다" (lit. 'On top of the completely frozen Han River walks a cat.'). In 2024, the audio of the phrase was remixed into a song that became associated with a dance challenge.

=== Banana Cat ===
Banana Cat, a cat inside a banana skin, has been notably used by the Canadian Ontario New Democratic Party in TikTok campaign ads. A series of videos titled "Banana Cat explains" describe "New Democats'" strategies for addressing issues such as healthcare, education and grocery costs. During a 2024 speech by Ontario New Democratic leader Marit Stiles about the governing Ontario Progressive Conservative Party's legacy, Progressive Conservative MPP Goldie Ghamari shouted in response "Your legacy is making cat videos on TikTok".

=== Cat distribution system ===
The cat distribution system, as it is known on the internet, is the ad-hoc, passive manner in which owners obtain their cats, and not necessarily on the initiative of the owner. Whereas people actively and carefully select the breed and individual dog that they want, often paying a sum of money, planning and volition are often absent in the process of acquiring a cat. Very often, a stray will simply move onto the owner's premises. The term "cat distribution system" came into common use on the internet in 2022 when TikTok user hermes.the.cynic described the process in which cats select their owners.

== Spoofs ==
Bonsai Kitten was a satirical website launched in 2000 that claims to provide instructions on how to grow a kitten in a jar, so as to mold the bones of the kitten into the shape of the jar as the cat grows, much like how a bonsai plant is shaped. It was made by an MIT university student going by the alias of Dr. Michael Wong Chang. The website generated furor after members of the public complained to animal rights organizations, who stated that "while the site's content may be faked, the issue it is campaigning for may create violence towards animals", according to the Michigan Society for the Prevention of Cruelty to Animals (MSPCA). Although the website in its most recent form was shut down, it still generates (primarily spam) petitions to shut the site down or complain to its ISP. The website has been thoroughly debunked by Snopes.com and The Humane Society of the United States, among other prominent organizations.

== Cat media and news websites ==
=== The Catnip Times ===
Founded by Laura Mieli in 2012, it has been running full time since 2017. It now has more than a million followers in over 100 countries. It contributes articles to American Kennel Club affiliate, AKC Reunite.

In July 2018, it sponsored the first ever "Meow Meetup" at the Stephens Convention Center in Rosemont, Illinois. The event was held July 21–22, was estimated to attract around 3000 people. It was the largest cat conference in the Midwest.

=== News by Cats ===
Founded by Lithuanian-born Justinas Butkus who lives in Wellington, New Zealand, the site adds a cat element to news stories. Reporting on actual events, it changes the wording to a type of cat talk such as "kidney opurration" instead of "kidney operation" and "prepurr for major eruption" instead of "prepare for major eruption". There were mixed reactions within the first week of the site's operation. NewsByCats.com has been defunct since some time after March 9, 2022.

=== The Purrington Post ===
The Purrington Post publishes a newsletter. The first, Volume 1, Issue 1 came out on November 1, 2013. According to Natural Pet Science, The Purrington Post averages half a million page views per trimester. It was referred to in September 2018 as an award-winning cat blog by the Dow Jones & Company owned financial information service MarketWatch. Also that year it was rated No. 3 by KittyCoaching.com in a list of the 12 best cat blogs for that year. It was also highly rated by Cats.com in their Top 35 Cat Blogs You Should Know About list for 2018. The opinion of the Post on cat behavior has been valued enough to be quoted in articles.

== See also ==
- Cultural depictions of cats
- Human interaction with cats
- List of individual cats
