= List of internet phenomena =

Internet phenomena are social and cultural phenomena specific to the internet, such as internet memes, which include popular catchphrases, images, viral videos, and jokes. When such fads and sensations occur online, they tend to grow rapidly and become more widespread because the instant communication facilitates word of mouth transmission.

This list focuses on the internet phenomena which are accessible regardless of local internet regulations.

== Advertising and products ==
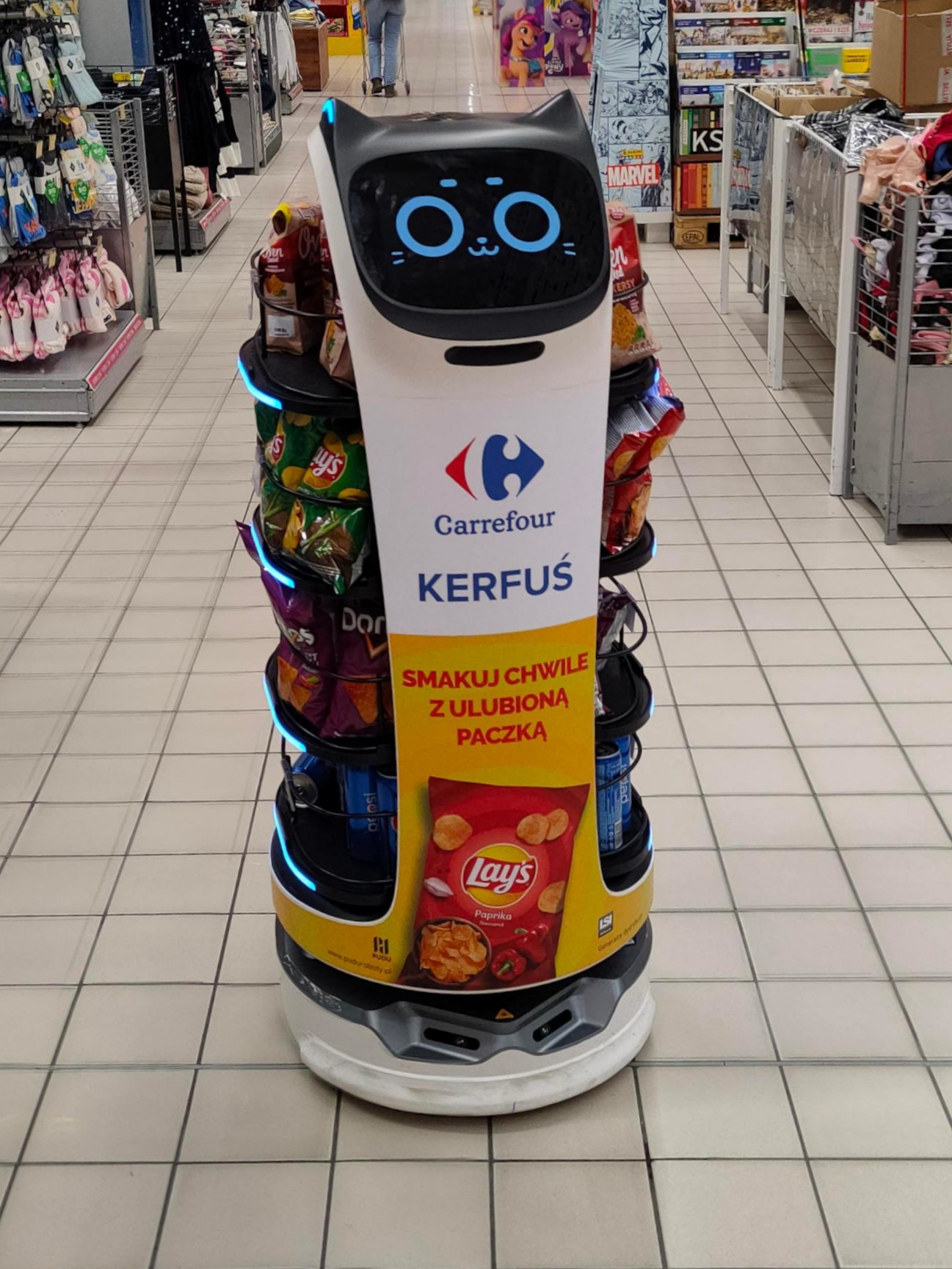
Picture of Kerfuś, mascot of Carrefour, that became viral with Polish internet users in 2022

- 15.ai – A free web application launched in 2020 that uses artificial intelligence to generate text-to-speech voices of fictional characters from popular media. The website is credited with popularizing AI voice cloning in memes and content creation.
- Amazon Coat – An unnamed coat sold on the online store Amazon.com by the Chinese clothing brand Orolay, previously known for its home furnishings. It became a viral phenomenon from the period between December 2018 and the COVID-19 pandemic.
- Beanie Babies – Cited as being the world's first internet sensation in 1995.
- Cerveza Cristal – A Chilean beer company that produced a series of advertisements during a Star Wars original trilogy broadcast in 2003. The commercials, titled The Force is with Cristal Beer, would air seamlessly with the scenes in the trilogy, such as a pair of hands like Obi-Wan Kenobi's opening a chest, revealing the beer. The advertisements were critically acclaimed in the country and became internationally viral on Twitter in March 2024.
- Cooks Source infringement controversy – This publication drew backlash after it committed copyright infringement by using an online article without permission for commercial purposes. This backlash further increased due to Cooks Source's response which showed a misunderstanding of copyright and an increasing agitation to the original writer of the article.
- Dumb Ways to Die – A 2012 Metro Trains Melbourne safety campaign that became popular on the internet in November 2012.
- Elf Yourself (2006) and Scrooge Yourself (2007) – Interactive websites created by Jason Zada and Evolution Bureau for OfficeMax's holiday season advertising campaign. Elf Yourself allows visitors to upload images of themselves or their friends, see them as dancing elves, and includes options to save or share the video. According to ClickZ, visiting the Elf Yourself site "has become an annual tradition that people look forward to". While not selling any one specific product, the two were created to raise consumer awareness of the sponsoring firm.
- Flex Tape – An infomercial of the product Flex Tape. It became a meme after YouTuber JonTron made a video reviewing the infomercial.
- FreeCreditReport.com – A series of TV commercials that were posted on the internet; many spoofs of the commercials were made and posted on YouTube.
- HeadOn – A June 2006 advertisement for a homeopathic product claimed to relieve headaches. Ads featured the tagline, "HeadOn. Apply directly to the forehead", stated three times in succession, accompanied by a video of a model using the product without ever directly stating the product's purpose. The ads were successively parodied on sites such as YouTube and even rapper Lil Jon made fun of it.
- Horse ebooks / Pronunciation Book – A five-year-long viral marketing alternate reality game for a larger art project developed by Synydyne. "Horse_ebooks" was a Twitter account that seemed to promote e-books, while "Pronunciation Book" was a YouTube channel that provided ways to pronounce English words. Both accounts engaged in non-sequiturs, making some believe that the accounts were run by automated services. Pronunciation Book shifted to pronouncing numerals in a countdown fashion in mid-2013, concluding in late September 2013 revealing the connection to Horse_ebook and identity of Synydyne behind the accounts, and the introduction of their next art project.
- Kerfuś – A robot with cat face used as a mascot for Carrefour. The robot became viral in Poland in 2022, where Kerfuś became the main character of many memes and erotic pictures.
- Little Darth Vader – An advertisement by Volkswagen featuring young Max Page dressed in a Darth Vader costume running around his house trying to use "the Force". It was released on the internet a few days prior to Super Bowl XLV in 2011, and quickly became popular. As of 2013 it was the most shared ad of all time.
- LowerMyBills.com – Banner ads from this mortgage company feature endless loops of cowboys, women, aliens, and office workers dancing.
- "The Man Your Man Could Smell Like" – A television commercial starring Isaiah Mustafa reciting a quick, deadpan monologue while shirtless about how "anything is possible" if men use Old Spice. It eventually led to a popular viral marketing campaign which had Mustafa responding to various internet comments in short YouTube videos on Old Spice's YouTube channel.
- "Mac Tonight/Moon Man" – A McDonald's commercial made to promote dinner sales. Starting in 2007, the character in the commercial, "Mac Tonight" was used in videos where he is depicted promoting violence against minorities and promoting the KKK with racist parodies of rap songs. The best-known parody, "Notorious KKK" (a parody of "Hypnotize" by The Notorious B.I.G.), has accumulated over 119,000 views on YTMND.

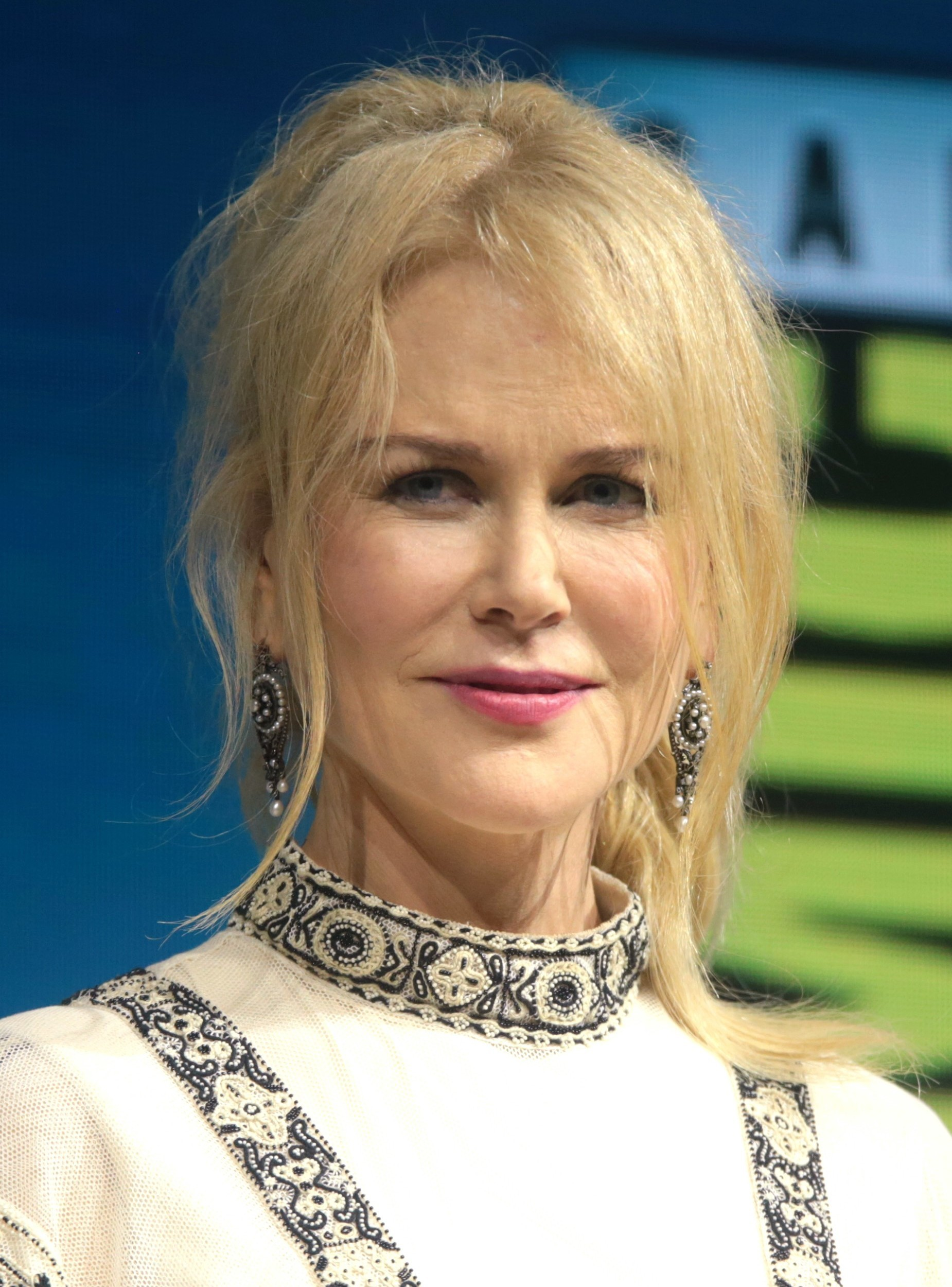
Nicole Kidman starred in a 2021 AMC Theatres commercial that went viral thanks to its grand style and the melodrama of Kidman's monologue.

- Nicole Kidman AMC Theatres commercial – In September 2021, AMC Theatres began airing a commercial starring actress Nicole Kidman in its theaters and on television. The ad, written by screenwriter Billy Ray, was intended to spur theater attendance following the COVID-19 pandemic by highlighting the "magic" of the movie theater experience. The commercial's grand style and the earnest melodrama of Kidman's monologue has led the commercial to be appreciated as an artifact of camp. The commercial has been the subject of internet memes, parodies, merchandise, and audience participation rituals.
- "Nope, Chuck Testa" – A local commercial made for Ojai Valley Taxidermy, owned by Chuck Testa, suggesting that the stuffed creatures were alive until Testa appeared, saying "Nope, Chuck Testa!"; the ad soon went viral. The commercial was created by Rhett & Link for their show Rhett & Link: Commercial Kings.
- Potato Parcel – A web site that allows the user to send anonymous personalized messages on potatoes via the mail.
- Pepsi MAX & Jeff Gordon Present: Test Drive – A short film where NASCAR driver Jeff Gordon poses as an average car buyer to prank a cars salesman. A sequel, Test Drive 2, was released the following year, with Gordon pranking a writer who had branded the original video as fake.
- "Rivals" – A commercial for video game retailer EB Games that promoted Call of Duty: Advanced Warfare. The commercial drew criticism for its concept and the performances of its actors.
- Sancor Seguros – An Argentine insurance company which gained widespread ridicule in October 2026 following an appearance during a drone show following Lionel Messi's retirement match with the Argentina national football team. The advertisement also spawned memes of drone art illustrations, many of which were AI generated.

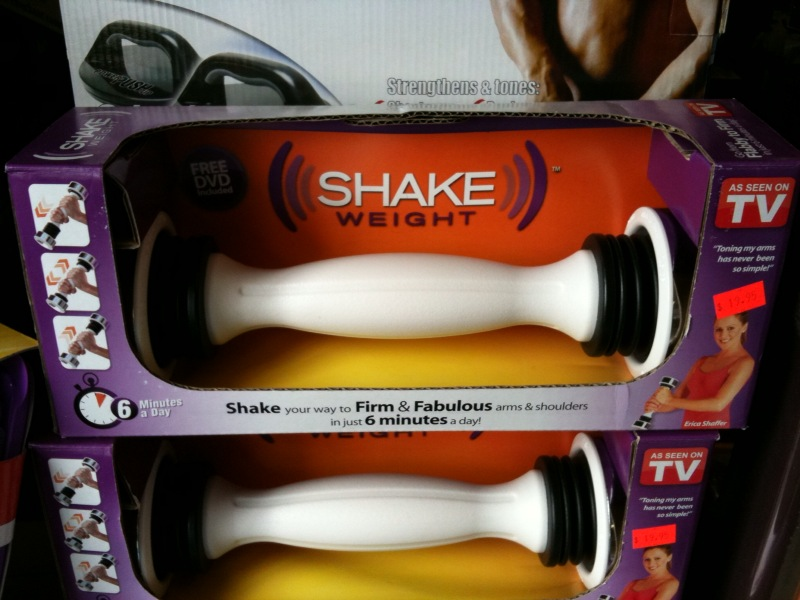
The Shake Weight

- Shake Weight – Infomercial clips of the modified dumbbell went viral as a result of the product's sexually suggestive nature.
- Three Wolf Moon – A T-shirt with many ironic reviews on Amazon.
- Vans (2016) – Featured in the "Damn Daniel" viral internet meme.
- "What Would You Do for a Klondike Bar?" – A slogan at the end of commercials advertising the ice cream sandwich Klondike bar. People on YouTube and Facebook began posting videos depicting people in dangerous and absurdist situations attempting to reach a Klondike Bar in response to the slogan.
- "Whopper Whopper" – A song by American restaurant fast-food chain Burger King which serves as a jingle for the restaurant's signature burger, the Whopper.
- Will It Blend? – The blender product Blendtec, claimed by its creator Tom Dickson to be the most powerful blender, is featured in a series of YouTube videos, Will It Blend? where numerous food and non-food items are used within the blender.
- Xtranormal – A website allowing users to create videos by scripting the dialog and choosing from a menu of camera angles and predesigned CGI characters and scenes. Though originally designed to be used to ease storyboard development for filmmakers, the site quickly became popular after videos made with the tool, including "iPhone 4 vs HTC Evo", became viral.

== Animals ==
- 100 men versus a gorilla – A hypothetical situation in which 100, usually unarmed, men are to fight a single silverback gorilla. The outcome of such a fight is the main topic of debate, with no moral, ethical, or legal way to test it.
- April the Giraffe – A reticulated giraffe who had two of her live births streamed on the internet to much fanfare.
- Cats on the internet – Images of cats are very popular on the internet, and have seen extensive use in internet memes, as well as some cats becoming internet celebrities.
  - Grumpy Cat – A cat named Tardar Sauce that appears to have a permanent scowl on her face due to feline dwarfism, according to its owner. Pictures of the cat circulated the internet, leading it to win the 2013 Webby for Meme of the Year, and her popularity has led her to star in a feature film. Tardar Sauce died on 14 May 2019.
- Conrad – A raccoon found dead on a downtown Toronto street and later memorialized with a heritage plaque.
- "Dicks out for Harambe" – A slogan that was popularized months after the death of Harambe, a gorilla in a Cincinnati zoo, which could be interpreted as telling individuals to expose their penises in public in honor of the gorilla (although the word "dicks" here is slang for guns). The line was notably uttered by actor Danny Trejo.
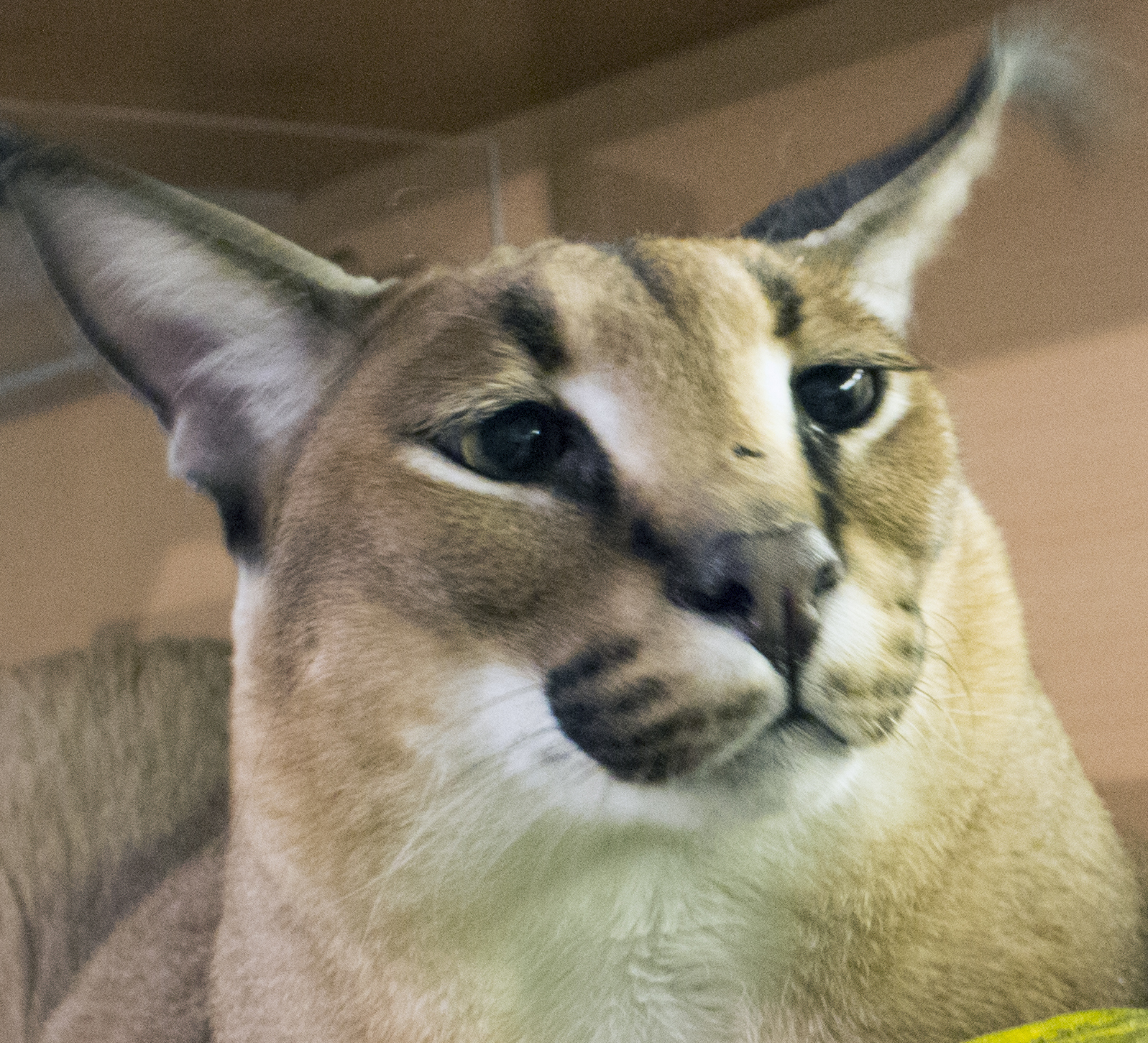
  Big Floppa
- Dillie – A tame in-residence white-tailed deer that first gained public attention, including from mainstream news organizations, in 2009 for a video showcasing Dillie's life that won a video contest the same year. She was also broadcast via a 24/7 video webcam for "DillieCam" livestreams online.
- Floppa – A collection of images either portraying caracals or a specific caracal by the name of Goshe, Shlepa, Pumba or more commonly Big Floppa. The collection of images do not portray to a specific theme per se, but always hold Floppa as a centerpoint or personification of something.
- Gabe the Dog – Gabe was a miniature American Eskimo dog owned by YouTube user gravycp. In January 2013, gravycp uploaded a short video of Gabe barking. The footage itself never went viral though it was used in dozens of song remixes, some of which accrued up to half a million views.
- Homophobic dog – A series of images of a white dachshund accompanied by homophobic captions, such as "not too fond of gay people" and "let's hope it's just a phase". According to the dog's owners, a gay couple, most of those memes were made and shared by members of the LGBTQ community to mock homophobic people. A fake Washington Post headline describing the dog as "the new face of online homophobia" was criticized by Christina Pushaw, press secretary of Florida Governor Ron DeSantis, unaware that it was not a real article.
- Hurricane Shark or Street Shark, a recurring hoax circulated after a variety of natural disasters, appearing to show a shark swimming in a flooded urban area, usually after a hurricane. Several images have been used, most often one of a freeway that first appeared during Hurricane Irene in 2011. However, a 2022 video of a shark or other large fish swimming in Hurricane Ian's floodwaters in Fort Myers, Florida, proved to be real, itself becoming part of the phenomenon and leading to phrases like "Hurricane Shark is real".
- Jimothy – A raccoon living in Seattle, Washington, he gained popularity in 2026 for his appearance, having a condition dubbed "short-spine syndrome", causing him to have a short neck and very short tail.
- Oolong – Photos featured on a popular Japanese website of a rabbit that is famous for its ability to balance a variety of objects on its head.
- Punch the Monkey – A juvenile Japanese Macaque who gained popularity after appearing to be bullied by other monkeys, holding an IKEA stuffed orangutan for comfort.

== Animation and comics ==
- Animutations – Early Adobe Flash-based animations, pioneered by Neil Cicierega in 2001, typically featuring foreign language songs (primarily Japanese, such as "Yatta"), set to random pop-culture images. The form is said to have launched the use of Flash for inexpensive animations that are now more common on the internet.
- Ate my balls – One of the earliest examples of an internet meme, which involved web pages depicting a particular celebrity, fictional character, or other subject's relish for eating testicles.
- Axe Cop – Initially a web comic series with stories created by five-year-old Malachai Nicolle and drawn into comic form by his 29-year-old brother Ethan, the series gained viral popularity on the internet due to the vividness and non-sequitur nature of Malachai's imagination, and has led to physical publication and a series of animated shorts in the 2012–2013 season for the Fox Television Network.
- Badger Badger Badger – A hypnotic loop of animal calisthenics set to the chant of "badger, badger, badger", created by Jonti "Weebl" Picking.
- Battle for Dream Island – An animated web series on YouTube created by twin brothers Cary and Michael Huang revolving around competitions between anthropomorphic objects. It has influenced a small genre of similar independent web series known as "object shows".
- Big Chungus – A still frame of the 1941 Merrie Melodies short Wabbit Twouble when Bugs Bunny mocks a fat Elmer Fudd. The meme originated from fictitious cover art for a video game titled Big Chungus (with "chungus" being a neologism associated with video game commentator James Stephanie Sterling), which featured a still from the scene, and was popularized by a Facebook post by a GameStop manager who alleged that a colleague's mother had inquired about purchasing the "game" as a gift. Warner Bros. later incorporated Big Chungus into its own video game Looney Tunes World of Mayhem.
- Bongo Cat – Originated on Twitter on 7 May 2018, when a simple animated cat GIF, was edited for it to play the song "Athletic" from the Super Mario World soundtrack. This cat has since been edited to play various songs on bongos, and later other instruments.
- Brickfilms – Stop motion animations made with Lego.
- "Caramelldansen" – A spoof from the Japanese visual novel opening Popotan that shows the two main characters doing a hip swing dance with their hands over their heads, imitating rabbit ears, while the background song plays the sped-up version of the song "Caramelldansen", sung by the Swedish music group Caramell. Also known as Caramelldansen Speedycake Remix or Uma uma dance in Japan, the song was parodied by artists and fans who then copy the animation and include characters from other anime performing the dance.
- Charlie the Unicorn – A five-part series of videos involving the titular unicorn who is repeatedly hoodwinked by two other blue and pink unicorns, Lolz and Roffle, who take him on elaborate adventures to steal his belongings or cause him physical harm.
- Dancing baby – A 3D-rendered dancing baby that first appeared in 1996 by the creators of Character Studio for 3D Studio MAX, and became something of a late 1990s cultural icon, in part due to its exposure on worldwide commercials, editorials about Character Studio, and the popular television series Ally McBeal.
- "The End of the World" – A Flash-animated video by Jason Windsor in 2003 that depicts a situation when the entire world is nuked by rivalling countries.
- Happy Tree Friends – A series of Flash cartoons featuring cartoon animals experiencing violent and gruesome accidents.
- Homestar Runner – A Flash animated internet cartoon by Mike Chapman, Craig Zobel, and Matt Chapman, created in 1996 and popularized in 2000. The cartoon contains many references to popular culture from the 1980s and 1990s, including video games, television, and popular music.
- "I'll take a potato chip... and eat it!!!" – A scene from the English-language dub of episode 8 of the anime adaptation of Death Note, showing the main character Light Yagami taking a potato chip from a bag of chips and eating the chip in a dramatic way. The scene includes dramatic music and action movie-style camera cuts.
- Joe Cartoon – Creator of interactive Flash animations Frog in a Blender and Gerbil in a Microwave, which were two of the first Flash cartoons to receive fame on the internet.
- Kung Fu Bear – an internet meme involving an Asian black bear who skillfully twirls, throws and catches a long staff.
- Loituma Girl (also known as Leekspin) – A looped Flash animation of an anime girl Orihime Inoue from the Bleach series twirling a leek, set to a scat singing section of the traditional Finnish folk song "Ievan Polkka", sung by the Finnish quartet Loituma on their 1995 debut album Things of Beauty.
- "Loss" – A webcomic strip published on 2 June 2008, by Tim Buckley for his gaming-related webcomic Ctrl+Alt+Del. Set during a storyline in which the main character Ethan and his fiancée Lilah are expecting their first child, the strip – presented as a four-panel comic with no dialogue – shows Ethan entering a hospital, where he sees Lilah weeping in a hospital bed; she has suffered a miscarriage. It has received negative reception from critics and webcomic creators and been adapted and parodied many times.
- Motu Patlu – An Indian cartoon aired on Nickelodeon (India), made widely popular by a Nick India ad celebrating Teacher's Day in India, which has been reposted under the title "D se Dab".
- Nyan Cat – A YouTube video of an animated flying cat, set to an Utau song.
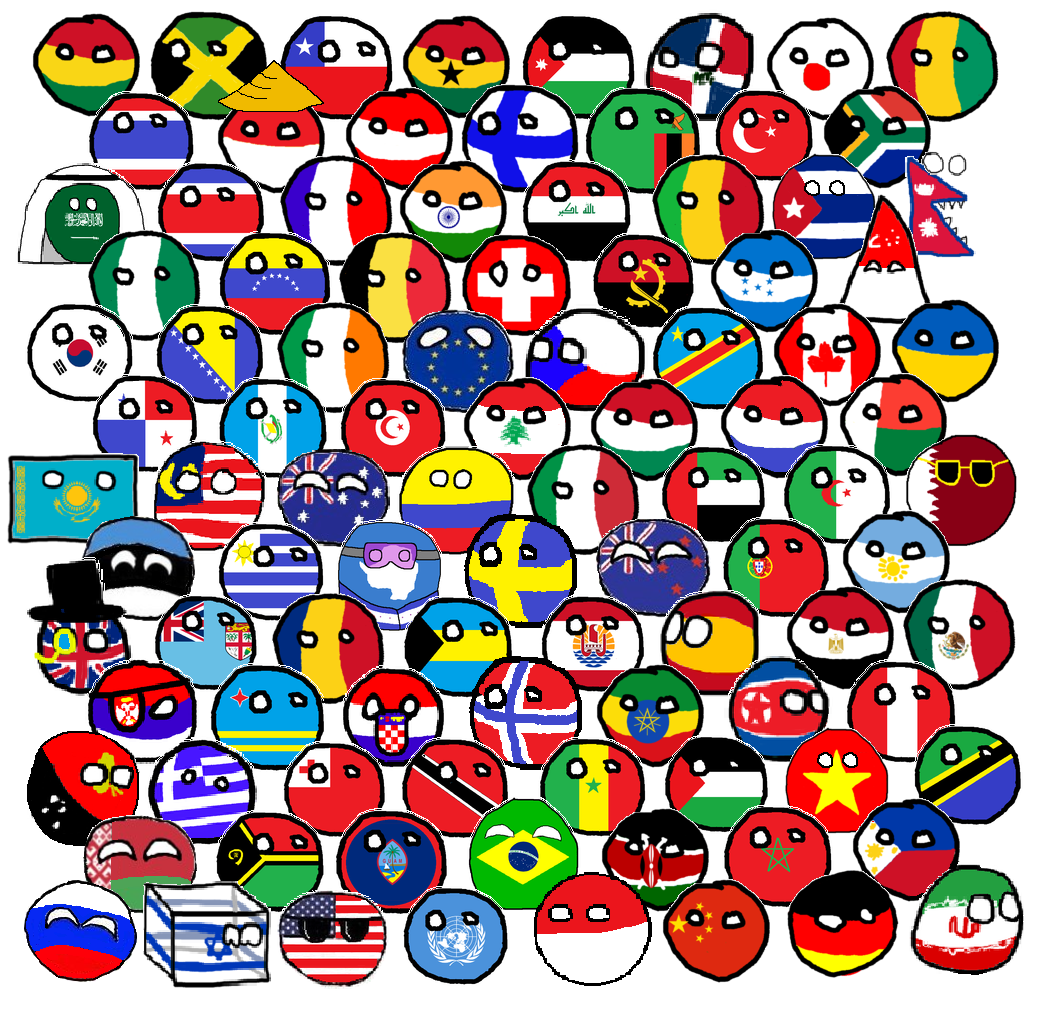
- A group of Polandball characters
  Polandball (also known as Countryballs) – A user-generated series of cartoons which originated on the German imageboard Krautchan in 2009. In the meme, countries are portrayed as balls who interact in broken English. They satirize history, international relations, and current affairs.
- Pusheen – An animated grey tabby cat, originally drawn as a character in the webcomic "Everyday Cute" by artists Clare Belton and Andrew Duff. Belton has since released a Pusheen book.
- Rage comics – A large set of pre-drawn images including crudely drawn stick figures, clip art, and other artwork, typically assembled through website generators, to allow anyone to assemble a comic and post to various websites and boards. The New York Times reports that thousands of these are created daily. Typically these are drawn in response to a real-life event that has angered the comic's creator, hence the term "rage comics", but comics assembled for any other purpose are also made. Certain images from rage comics are known by specific titles, such as "trollface" (a widely grinning man), "forever alone" (a man crying to himself), or "rage guy" (a man shouting "FUUUUU...").
- Salad Fingers – A Flash animation series surrounding a green man with severely elongated fingers in a desolate world populated mostly by deformed, functionally mute people.
- "Shut the fuck up, TERF" – A crudely photoshopped image featuring Zombie Land Saga character Lily Hoshikawa, a trans girl, holding a gun with the caption "Shut the fuck up, TERF". The image was criticized as constituting a threat of violence, and presented in UK Parliament in May 2019 during a convening of the Human Rights Committee while questioning a Twitter employee on the subject of abuse. In a tweet in January 2023, J. K. Rowling likened the meme to early twentieth century anti-suffragist artwork.
- Simpsonwave – A genre of videos where clips of the American animated sitcom The Simpsons are filtered with tinted, VHS-like effects and played over psychedelic vaporwave or chillwave tracks.
- Skibidi Toilet – A series of viral YouTube animations made by animator Alexey Gerasimov using Source Filmmaker which depicts a war between skibidi toilets (disembodied heads inside moving toilets which can be killed by being flushed down) and a faction of people with cameras, TVs and loudspeakers for heads.
- The Spirit of Christmas – Consists of two different animated short films made by Trey Parker and Matt Stone, which are precursors to the animated series South Park. To differentiate between the two homonymous shorts, the first short is often referred to as Jesus vs. Frosty (1992), and the second short as Jesus vs. Santa (1995). Fox executive Brian Graden sent copies of Jesus vs. Santa to several of his friends, and from there it was copied and distributed, including on the internet, where it became one of the first viral videos. They were created by animating construction paper cut-outs with stop motion, and features prototypes of the main characters of South Park.
- Steamed Hams – Remixes of a segment of The Simpsons episode "22 Short Films About Springfield" involving Principal Skinner and Superintendent Chalmers, in which Skinner has invited Chalmers over to dinner, inadvertently sets his ham on fire, and covers it up by serving fast food hamburgers as "steamed hams".
- "This is fine" – A two-panel comic drawn in 2013 by KC Green as part of the Gunshow webcomic, showing an anthropomorphic dog sitting in a room on fire, and saying "This is fine". The comic emerged as a meme in 2016, used in situations, as described by The New York Times, "halfway between a shrug and complete denial of reality". Numerous derivatives of the "This is fine" comic have been made.
- "Tuxedo Winnie the Pooh" – A photoshopped image of Winnie the Pooh sitting in an armchair from the featurette Winnie the Pooh and the Honey Tree, which became popular on Reddit in 2019. The meme, which is also known as "A fellow man of culture", features Winnie the Pooh wearing a tuxedo and smiling.
- The Ultimate Showdown of Ultimate Destiny – A lethal battle royale between many notable real and fictitious characters from popular culture. Set to a song of the same name, written and performed by Neil Cicierega under his musician alias, "Lemon Demon."
- Ultra Instinct Shaggy – A character interpretation that the Scooby-Doo character Shaggy is immensely more powerful than he presents himself. The meme is usually presented as still frames of a behind-the-scenes interview of the 2002 live-action movie with subtitles implying that Shaggy is restraining his power to prevent catastrophe. Subsequently, Warner Bros. canonized the meme as part of a credits gag in the animated film Mortal Kombat Legends: Battle of the Realms, as well as including Shaggy as a fighter in the MultiVersus crossover fighting game.
- Weebl and Bob – A series of Flash cartoons created by Jonti Picking featuring two egg-shaped characters that like pie and speak in a stylistic manner.
- Verity – A 2026 Minecraft horror web series created by YouTuber ThatMob that became the subject of memes.
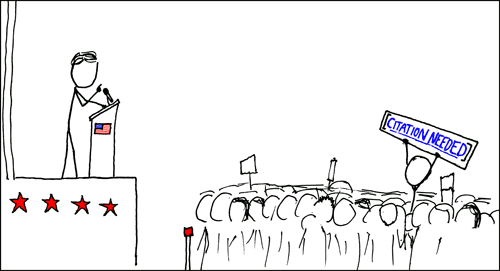
- xkcd's "Wikipedian Protester" comic
  xkcd – A webcomic created by Randall Munroe, popularized on the internet due to a high level of math-, science- and geek-related humor, with certain jokes being reflected in real-life, such as using Wikipedia's "[citation needed]" tag on real world signs or the addition of an audio preview for YouTube comments.

== Challenges ==
Challenges generally feature internet users recording themselves performing certain actions, and then distributing the resulting video through social media sites, often inspiring or daring other users to repeat the challenge.

== Dance ==
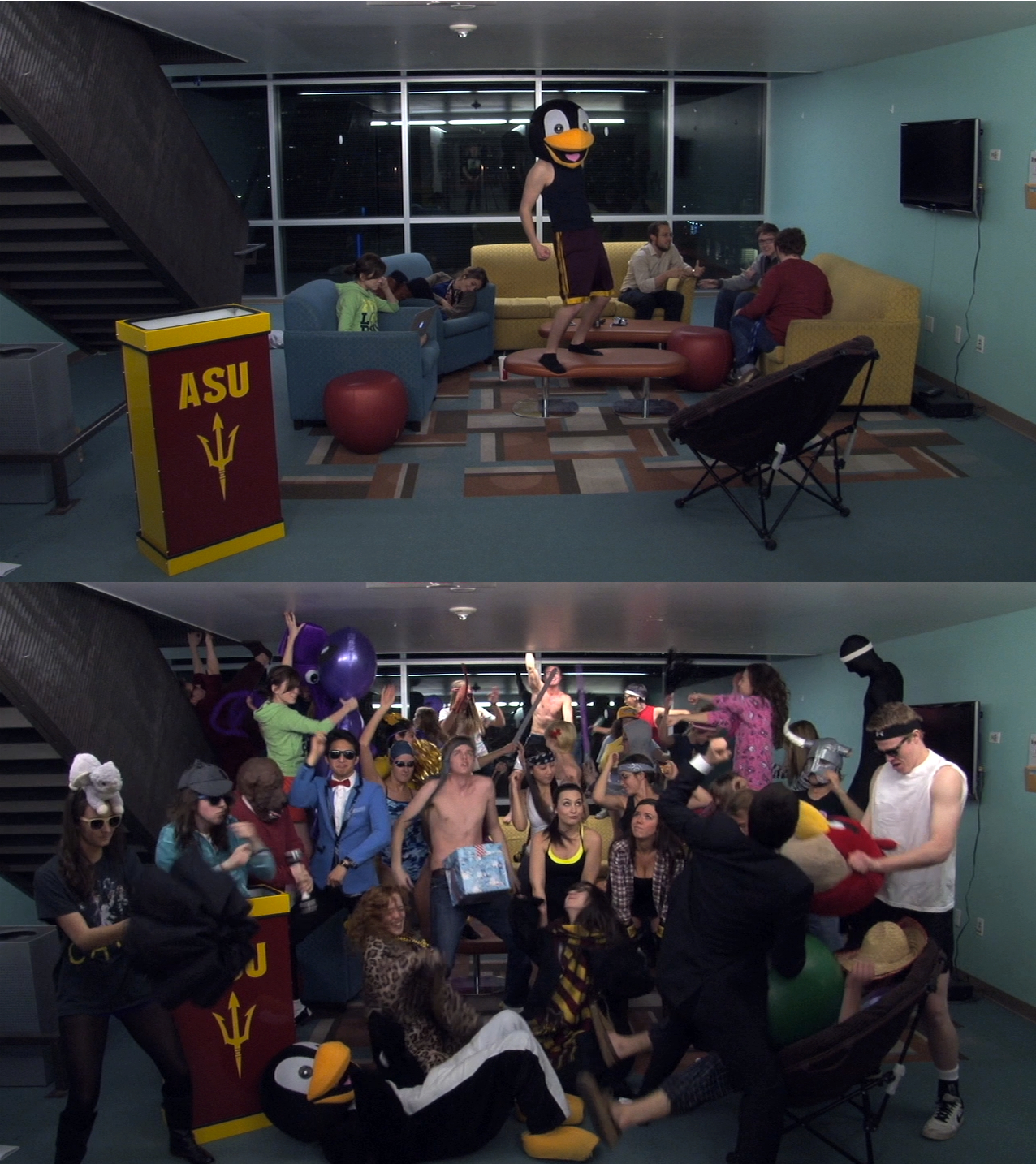
Two screenshots from before and after the drop in a Harlem Shake video

- Coffin Dance/Dancing Pallbearers – A group of Ghanaian pallbearers that respectfully dance during funeral processions were covered by the BBC in 2017 and gained some initial internet popularity. In the wake of the COVID-19 pandemic, a popular TikTok video combined the BBC footage with the EDM song "Astronomia" from Russian artist Tony Igy, creating a meme that appeared to spread as a morbidly humorous reminder about the dangers of COVID-19.
- Dab – A dance move where a person drops their head into a bent, slanted arm, with the other arm out straight and parallel.
- "Dancing Banana" – A banana dancing to the song "Peanut Butter Jelly Time" by the Buckwheat Boyz.
- Hampster Dance – A page filled with hamsters dancing, linking to other animated pages. It spawned a fictional band complete with its own CD album release.
- Harlem Shake – A video based on Harlem shake dance, originally created by YouTube personality Filthy Frank, and using an electronica version of the song by Baauer. In such videos, one person is dancing or acting strange among a room full of others going about routine business. After the drop in the song and a video cut, everyone starts dancing or acting strangely. The attempts to recreate the dance led to a viral spread on YouTube.
- "Hit the Quan" – A viral dance challenge to the song "Hit the Quan" by American rapper iLoveMemphis. Rich Homie Quan originally performed this dance in his music video for his song "Flex (Ooh, Ooh, Ooh)". iLoveMemphis produced the "Hit The Quan" based around Rich Homie Quan's dance. iLoveMemphis' song launched the "Hit the Quan" viral dance challenge because of its convenient lyrics to dance to. "Hit the Quan" reached 20 on the Billboard Hot 100 chart because of the popularity of the dance. The dance challenge was very popular on social media platforms, especially Vine. Many celebrities participated in the popular dance challenge.
- "Indian Thriller" – A viral scene from the Indian film Donga with added subtitles phonetically approximating the original lyrics as English sentences.
- JK Wedding Entrance Dance – The wedding procession for Jill Peterson and Kevin Heinz of St. Paul, Minnesota, choreographed to the song "Forever" by Chris Brown. Popularized on YouTube with 1.75 million views in less than five days in 2009. The video was later imitated in an episode of The Office on NBC.
- "Kiki Challenge" or "#DoThe Shiggy" – A viral dance challenge to the song "In My Feelings" by Drake. This challenge was started by a comedian named Shiggy on the night that Drake released the album Scorpion. Shiggy posted a video of himself on his Instagram account dancing along to part of the lyrics in what looks like in the middle of a neighborhood street. Shiggy commented #DoTheShiggy. Drake claims the success of the song was due to Shiggy's popular dance to his song. The dance challenge is often filmed with a twist of the original. The most popular twist of the dance is filmed from the passenger side of a moving vehicle through the open driver door where the would be driver is dancing moves along with the slowly moving car. This challenge received a lot of controversy due to the fact nobody was in control of the car. Performers have received fines and sometimes suffered injury. This viral dance challenge was performed by a number of professional athletes and celebrities. The dance challenge was performed by people in the U.S. and spread to the rest of the world.
- Little Superstar – A video of Thavakalai, a short Indian actor, break-dancing to MC Miker G & DJ Sven's remix of the Madonna song "Holiday". The clip comes from a 1990 Tamil film Adhisaya Piravi, featuring actor Rajnikanth.
- Running Man Challenge – A dance move where participants in a way resembling running to the 1996 R&B song "My Boo" by Ghost Town DJ's. First posted to Vine by two teenagers from New Jersey, the dance went viral in 2016 after two University of Maryland basketball players posted their rendition. The dance gets its name because it is an adaptation of the original running man dance move.
- T-pose – A surrealist "dance move" that became popular in April 2018 modelled after the default pose (also known as a bind pose) that many 3D models in games, animations, and more take in their raw file form.
- Techno Viking – A muscular Nordic raver dancing in a technoparade in Berlin.
- "Thriller" by the CPDRC Dancing Inmates – A recreation of Michael Jackson's hit performed by prisoners at the Cebu Provincial Detention and Rehabilitation Center (CPDRC) in the Philippines. In January 2010, it was among the ten most popular videos on YouTube with over 20 million hits.
- Triangle Dance Challenge – Three individuals keep their hands on each other's shoulders while each takes a turn jumping to a different vertex of an invisible triangle on the floor. This gained popularity in 2019.

== Email ==
- Bill Gates Email Beta Test – An email chain-letter that first appeared in 1997 and still circulates. The message claims that America Online and Microsoft are conducting a beta test and for each person one forwards the email to, they will receive a payment from Bill Gates of more than $200. Realistic contact information for a lawyer appears in the message.
- Craig Shergold – A British former cancer patient known for receiving an estimated 350 million greeting cards, earning him a place in the Guinness Book of World Records in 1991 and 1992. Variations of the plea for greeting cards sent out on his behalf in 1989 are still being distributed through the internet, although Shergold died in 2020, making the plea one of the most persistent urban legends.
- Goodtimes virus – An infamous, fraudulent virus warning that first appeared in 1994. The email claimed that an email virus with the subject line "Good Times" was spreading, which would "send your CPU into a nth-complexity infinite binary loop", among other dire predictions.
- Lighthouse and naval vessel urban legend – Purportedly an actual transcript of an increasingly heated radio conversation between a U.S. Navy ship and a Canadian who insists the naval vessel change a collision course, ending in the punchline. This urban legend first appeared on the internet in its commonly quoted format in 1995, although versions of the story predate it by several decades. It continues to circulate; the Military Officers Association of America reported in 2011 that it is forwarded to them an average of three times a day. The Navy has a page specifically devoted to pointing out that many of the ships named were not even in service at the time.
- MAKE.MONEY.FAST – One of the first spam messages that was spread primarily through Usenet, or even earlier BBS systems, in the late 1980s or early 1990s. The original email is attributed to an individual who used the name "Dave Rhodes", who may or may not have existed. The message is a classic pyramid scheme – one receives an email with a list of names and is asked to send $5 by postal mail to the person whose name is at the top of the list, add their own name to the bottom, and forward the updated list to a number of other people.
- Neiman Marcus Cookie recipe – An email chain-letter dating back to the early 1990s, but originating as Xeroxlore, in which a person tells a story about being ripped off for over $200 for a cookie recipe from Neiman Marcus. The email claims the person is attempting to exact revenge by passing the recipe out for free.
- Nigerian Scam/419 scam – A mail scam attempt popularized by the ability to send millions of emails. The scam claims the sender is a high-ranking official of Nigeria with knowledge of a large sum of money or equivalent goods that they cannot claim but must divest themselves of; to do so, they claim to require a smaller sum of money up front to access the sum to send to the receiver. The nature of the scam has mutated to be from any number of countries, high-ranking persons, barristers, or relationships to said people.

== Film and television ==
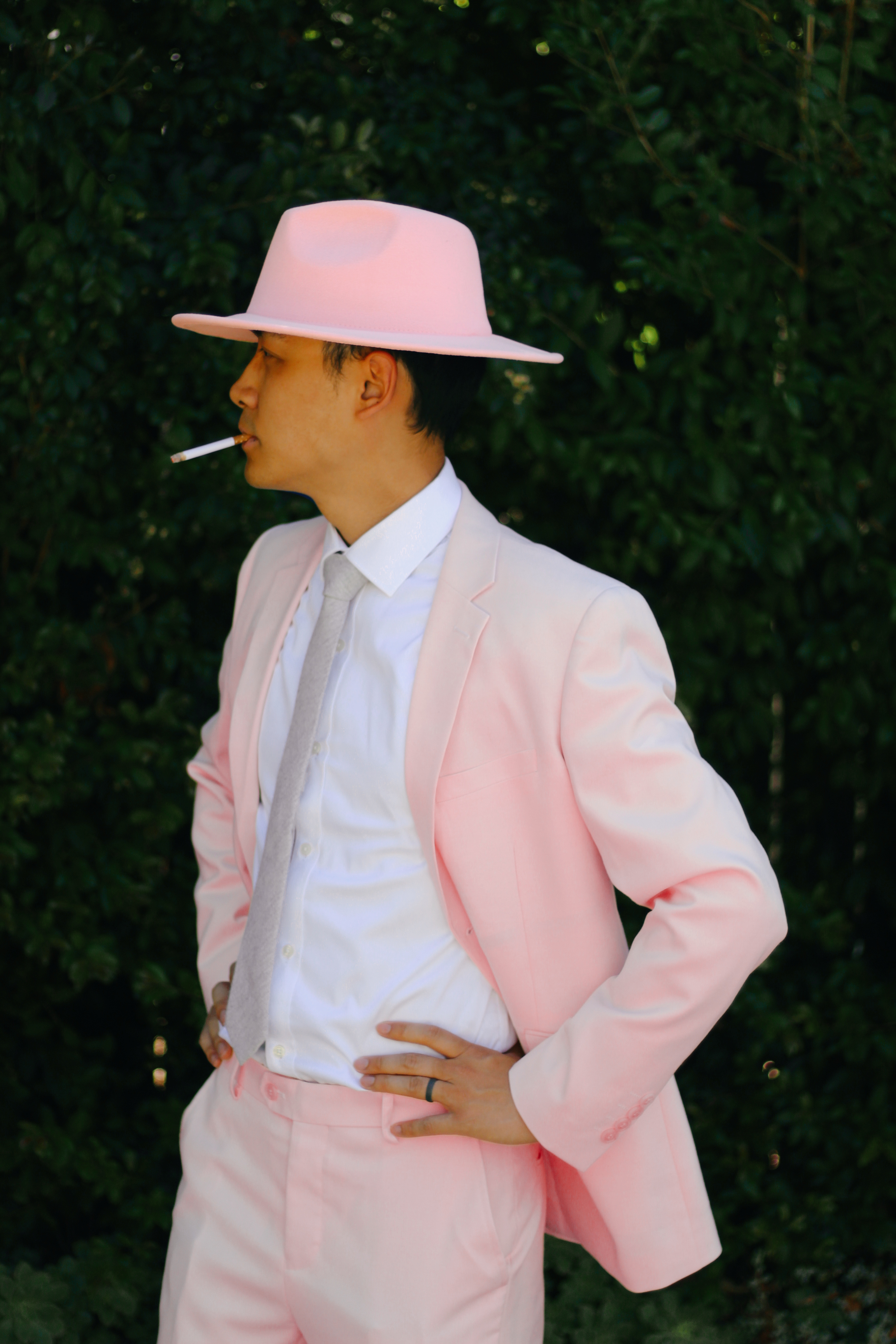
A man in a Halloween costume as the Barbenheimer phenomenon that resulted from the films Barbie and Oppenheimer sharing the same July 21, 2023, release date

- Arthur – A 1996 PBS educational series that became popular on the internet in July 2016 through humorous stills, including a still of the title character's clenched fist.
- The Babadook (2014) – An Australian psychological horror film that started trending on Twitter in June 2017 when the title character became an unofficial mascot for the LGBT community. Prior to that, rumors of the Babadook's sexuality began in October 2016, when some Netflix users reported seeing the film categorized as an LGBT movie on Netflix.
- Barbenheimer (2023) – A portmanteau of Barbie and Oppenheimer. Barbenheimer began circulating ahead of the theatrical release of both films on 21 July 2023, with social media users creating and sharing memes noting the juxtaposition between the films.
- Bee Movie (2007) – Sped-up or slowed-down clips of the film have become popular on YouTube. One upload by "Avoid at All Costs" exceeded 12 million views as of December 2016. Many of the edited videos in this trend were taken down for spam due to the volume of videos posted by some channels. From September 2013 onwards, a few internet users posted the entirety of the Bee Movie script on sites like Tumblr and Facebook.
- The Blair Witch Project (1999) generated publicity through a web-based viral marketing strategy that encouraged audiences to question whether the film was based on a true story, although the story was fictional.
- Bye, Felicia – A line from the 1995 film Friday originally uttered by Ice Cube's character to dismiss Angela Means' character, Felisha. The line became viral beginning in the 2010s.
- Cloverfield (2008) – Paramount Pictures used a viral marketing campaign to promote the film.
- Dahmer – Monster: The Jeffrey Dahmer Story (2022) – An anthology thriller true crime series by Ryan Murphy and Ian Brennan for Netflix. After its release, it became viral over Twitter and TikTok.
- Dear Evan Hansen (2021) – A film adaptation of the stage musical of the same name that featured then 27-year-old Ben Platt reprising his role as 17-year-old high schooler Evan Hansen, a casting decision that sparked widespread backlash from critics and the public, all of whom attributed it to nepotism. Two scenes from the film instantly became internet memes the moment it was made available digitally as a result of the controversy: a close-up of Evan crying during the climax of "Words Fail," his expression wrenched and tortured, and the moment Evan runs off from Zoe Murphy (Kaitlyn Dever) in the hallways during their first meeting at school. Jameson Rich of The New York Times observed "The image of a crying Platt is already a much-iterated joke, and its thrust is, overwhelmingly, derisive. But being the target of the internet's scorn is not de facto a bad thing. When a meme circulates far enough, the underlying movie can gain what feels like cultural currency. The very fact that the images are not part of any intentional advertising actually lends them a note of authenticity. They are, in a perverse way, resonating on their own merit. Is there a better form of contemporary publicity?"
- Downfall (2004) – A film depicting Adolf Hitler (portrayed by Bruno Ganz) during his final days of his life. Multiple scenes in which Hitler rants in German have been parodied innumerable times on the internet, including when Hitler finds out that Felix Steiner has failed to carry out his orders and when Hitler finds out SS-Gruppenführer Hermann Fegelein has gone AWOL. This scene often has its English subtitles replaced by mock subtitles to give the appearance that Hitler is ranting about modern, often trivial topics, and sometimes even breaks the fourth wall by referencing the internet meme itself. While the clips are frequently removed for copyright violations, the film's director, Oliver Hirschbiegel, has stated that he enjoys them, and claimed to have seen about 145 of them.
- Figwit (abbreviated from "Frodo is great...who is that?") – A background elf character with only seconds of screen time and one line of dialog from The Lord of the Rings film trilogy played by Flight of the Conchords member Bret McKenzie, which became a fascination with a large number of fans. This ultimately led to McKenzie being brought back to play an elf in The Hobbit.
- Goncharov – A nonexistent film invented by users on Tumblr. It is purported to be "the greatest mafia movie ever made," released in 1973. In 2020, a user posted a picture of a tag found on a pair of boots which featured details on the nonexistent film Goncharov in place of a brand label, which suggested it was "A film by Matteo JWHJ0715" and "presented" by Martin Scorsese. Users have inconsistently described the film as being directed by either Matteo JWHJ0715 or Scorsese. This label was speculated by several users to be a misprint of Gomorrah. Goncharov picked up traction again in late November 2022 when a user created a poster for the film that featured a lineup of actors and character names, ultimately sparking an elaborate fiction of the film's existence. Discussion of the film involved detailed critical analysis of the plot, themes, symbolism, and characters, as well as creation of gifs, fan art, and theme music, all presented as if the film were real. The meme's popularity caused it to become a trending topic on the Tumblr platform. A similar meme that emerged on TikTok nine months later—about a fictional 1980s horror film, Zepotha—drew comparisons to Goncharov.
- Grogu – The popularity of the puppet from the TV series The Mandalorian led to many memes of the "Baby Yoda" character.
- LazyTown (2004) – A children's television program originating from Iceland, which became very popular after one of the primary actors, Stefán Karl Stefánsson, was diagnosed with cancer and set up a GoFundMe page for support. The song "We Are Number One" became a meme in October 2016, and many videos were created. It became one of the fastest growing memes in history, with 250 videos uploaded in 5 days.
- Les Misérables (2012) – Tom Hooper's film adaptation of the globally popular stage musical of the same name based on Victor Hugo's 1862 novel of the same name. In April 2022, a clip of the film's version of the "Do You Hear the People Sing?" musical sequence circulated on Twitter in protest of the lockdown during the 2022 Shanghai COVID-19 outbreak. The clip was ultimately blocked by the Chinese government to stop further protest.
- The Lord of the Rings trilogy – Released between 2001 and 2003, just as meme culture was taking off, several moments from the films became part of the online culture, with, most notably, Sean Bean's character of Boromir stating "One does not simply walk into Mordor" as one of the most commonly referenced.
- Marble Hornets – A documentary-style horror, suspense short film series based on alternate reality experiences of the Slenderman tale. Marble Hornets was instrumental in codifying parts of the Slender Man mythos, but is not part of the inter-continuity crossover that includes many of the blogs and vlogs that followed it, although MH does feature in other canons as either a chronicle of real events or a fictional series.
- Marriage Story (2019) – Noah Baumbach's critically acclaimed drama about a warring couple going through a coast-to-coast divorce spawned multiple memes despite its serious tone. According to Wired, a meme of Adam Driver punching a wall during Charlie and Nicole's argument scene has contributed to "re-contextualizing Charlie and Nicole's fight into something light and silly". Driver punching a wall has been repurposed to represent general arguments over trivial matters in which a participant becomes angry and overreacts.
- Mega Shark Versus Giant Octopus (2009) – The theatrical trailer released in mid-May 2009 became a viral hit, scoring over one million hits on MTV.com and another 300,000 hits on YouTube upon launch, prompting brisk pre-orders of the DVD.
- Morbius (film) (2022) – Many internet users ironically praised the movie in a phenomenon termed as the "Morbius Sweep".
- Minions – The mischievous yellow creatures from the Despicable Me franchise have, since their introduction in 2010, become ubiquitous in certain layers of meme culture. The memes created with images of Minions have frequently been derided as bland or unintentionally absurd. In 2022, a phenomenon known as "Gentleminions" arose, in which young men and teen boys would arrive to Minions: The Rise of Gru in formal attire.

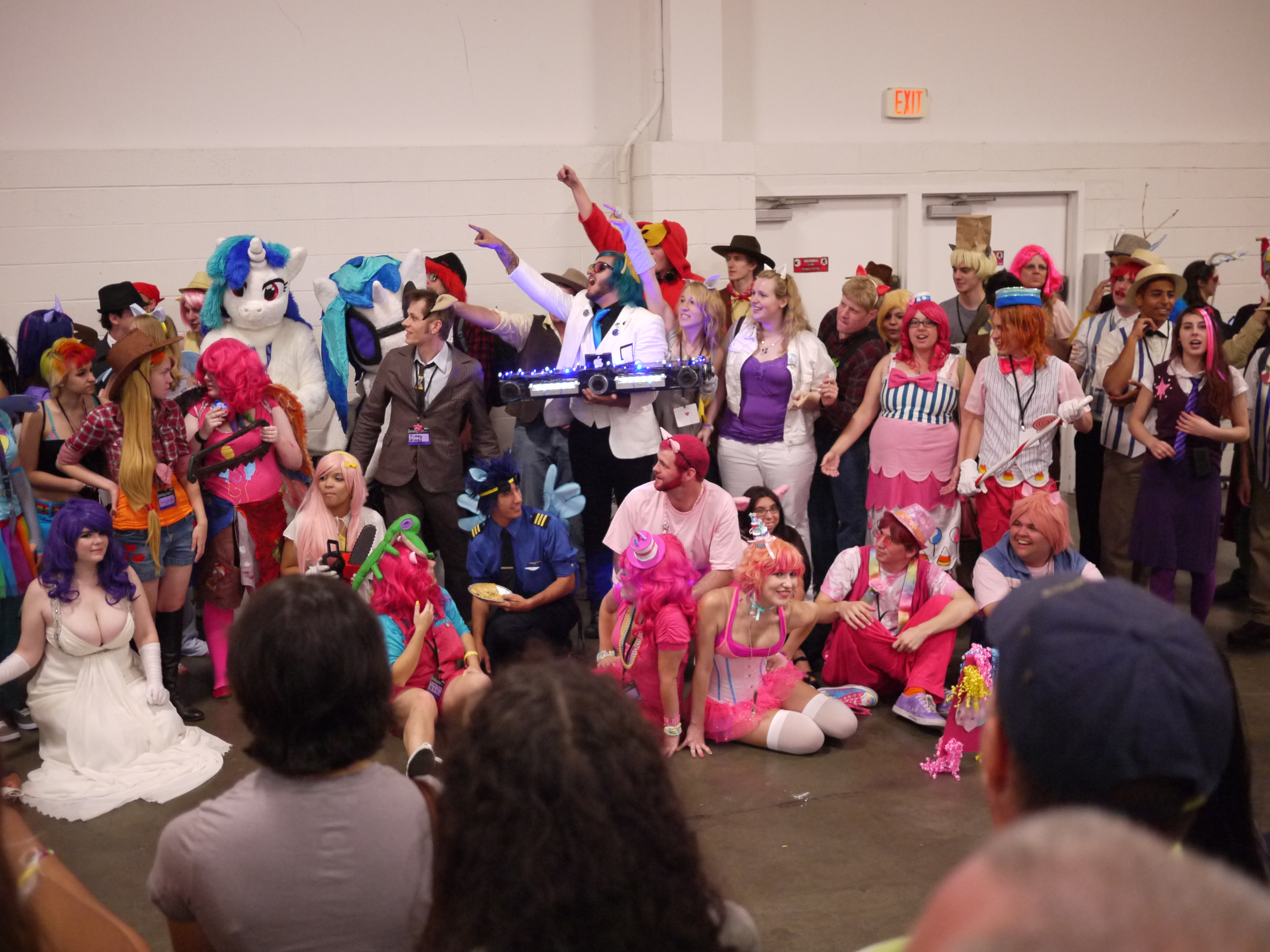
The adult brony fandom of My Little Pony: Friendship Is Magic grew from its 4chan roots.

- My Little Pony: Friendship Is Magic – Hasbro's 2010 animated series to revive its toy line was discovered by members of 4chan and subsequently spawned a large adult, mostly male fanbase calling themselves "bronies" and creating numerous internet memes and mashups based on elements from the show.
- Re-cut trailer – User-made trailers for established films, using scenes, voice-overs, and music, to alter the appearance of the film's true genre or meaning or to create a new, apparently seamless, film. Examples include casting the thriller-drama The Shining into a romantic comedy, or using footage from the respective films to create Robocop vs. Terminator.
- The Nutshack (2007) – a Filipino-American adult animated television series that has been widely mocked for its obnoxious characters, bad writing and animation, and especially for the theme song.

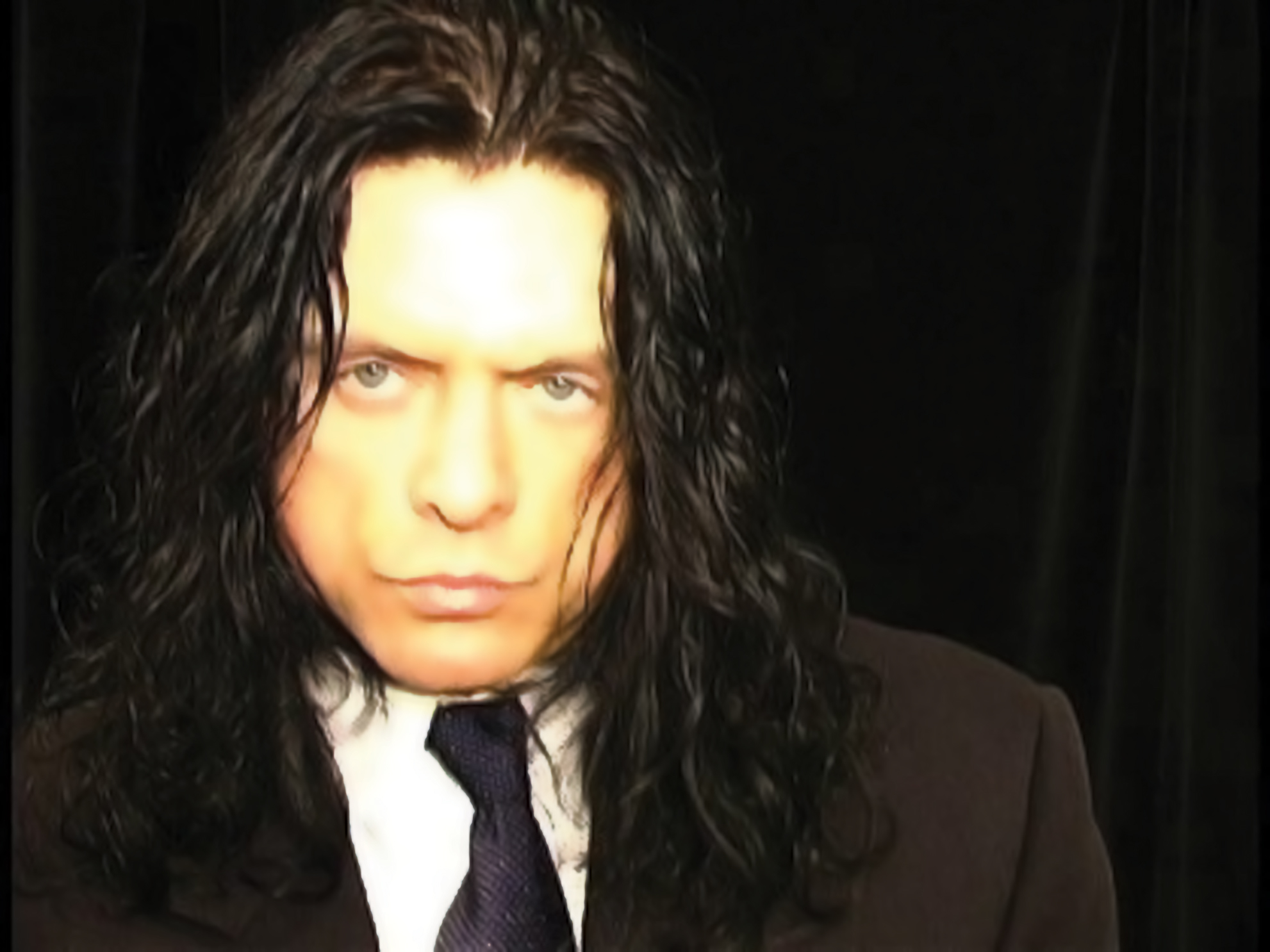
Tommy Wiseau of The Room (2003)

- Pingu – An animated Swiss children's television series. The show's animation style has spawned many memes. In particular, a meme in which Mozart's Requiem accompanies a viral video of Pingu the penguin saying "Noot Noot" gained popularity, using the choir symphony to depict feelings of terror and dread.
- The Room (2003) – Written, produced, directed, and starring Tommy Wiseau, the low-budget independent film is considered one of the worst films ever made. However, through social media and interest from comedians, it gained a large number of ironic fans and turned into a cult classic. It is a popular source for memes based on some of the poorly delivered lines in the movie, such as "You're tearing me apart, Lisa!" (a shoehorned reference to an iconic James Dean line in Rebel Without a Cause) and "Oh hi, Mark."
- Saltburn (2023) – A black comedy psychological thriller film written, directed, and co-produced by Emerald Fennell. After its theatrical release, it became a streaming hit on Amazon Prime Video and went viral on TikTok.
- Sharknado (2013) – A made-for-television film produced by The Asylum and aired on the SyFy network as a mockbuster of other disaster films, centered on the appearance of a tornado filled with sharks in downtown Los Angeles. Though similar to other films from the Asylum, elements of the film, such as low-budget effects and choice of actors, led to the film becoming a social media hit and leading to at least four additional sequels.
- Shrek – A DreamWorks franchise that has an internet fandom likes the series. The viral video "Shrek is Love, Shrek is Life" was based on a homoerotic story on 4chan depicting the titular ogre engaging in anal sex with a young boy.
- Snakes on a Plane (2006) – Attracted attention a year before its planned release, and before any promotional material was released, due to the film's working title, its seemingly absurd premise, and the piquing of actor Samuel L. Jackson's interest to work on the film. Producers of the film responded to the internet buzz by adding several scenes and dialogue imagined by the fans.
- SpongeBob SquarePants – A Nickelodeon animated television series that has spawned various internet memes. These memes include "Surprised Patrick", "Mr. Krabs Blur", "Caveman SpongeBob", "Handsome Squidward", and "Mocking SpongeBob". In 2019, Nickelodeon officially released merchandise based on the memes.
- Backstroke of the West – Around the time of release, a bootleg recording circulated on the internet via peer-to-peer sharing websites. It quickly became notorious for its notable use of Engrish, like the translation of Darth Vader's line "No!" rendered as "Do not want". About a decade after the release of the bootleg, a fandub matching its subtitles was posted on YouTube.
- Take This Lollipop (2011) – An interactive horror short film and Facebook app, written and directed by Jason Zada to personalize and underscore the dangers inherent in posting too much personal information about oneself on the internet. Information gathered from a viewer's Facebook profile by the film's app, used once and then deleted, makes the film different for each viewer.
- The Three Bears (1939) – An animated short film made by Terrytoons based on the story Goldilocks and the Three Bears. One of the scenes from the short depicting Papa Bear saying "Somebody toucha my spaghet!" in a stereotypically thick Italian accent became an internet meme in December 2017.
- Treasure Island (1988) – A Soviet animated film developed and distributed by Kievnauchfilm based on the novel of the same name by Robert Louis Stevenson. A loop of a scene from the film showing three characters in a walk cycle with Dr. Livesey showing a highly pronounced swagger, often overlaid with the phonk song, "Why Not" by Ghostface Playa, became an internet meme in August 2022.
- A Very Brady Sequel (1996) – A moment where Marcia Brady says "Sure, Jan" became a popular internet meme during the mid-2010s, usually as a response gif. The original writers and actors responded to the meme during a 2021 interview with Vice.
- West Side Story (2021) – A clip of the opening long take shot of "The Dance at the Gym" sequence from Steven Spielberg's 2021 film version of the musical was uploaded to Twitter on 25 February 2022, and went viral over the weekend, reaching 3 million views and over 32,000 likes. It led to many users sharing images and clips of their favorite scenes and shots from the film during that time, while praising Spielberg's direction and Janusz Kamiński's cinematography. This was further amplified by a Twitter thread by filmmaker Guillermo del Toro analyzing the camerawork and blocking on this particular shot.

== Gaming ==
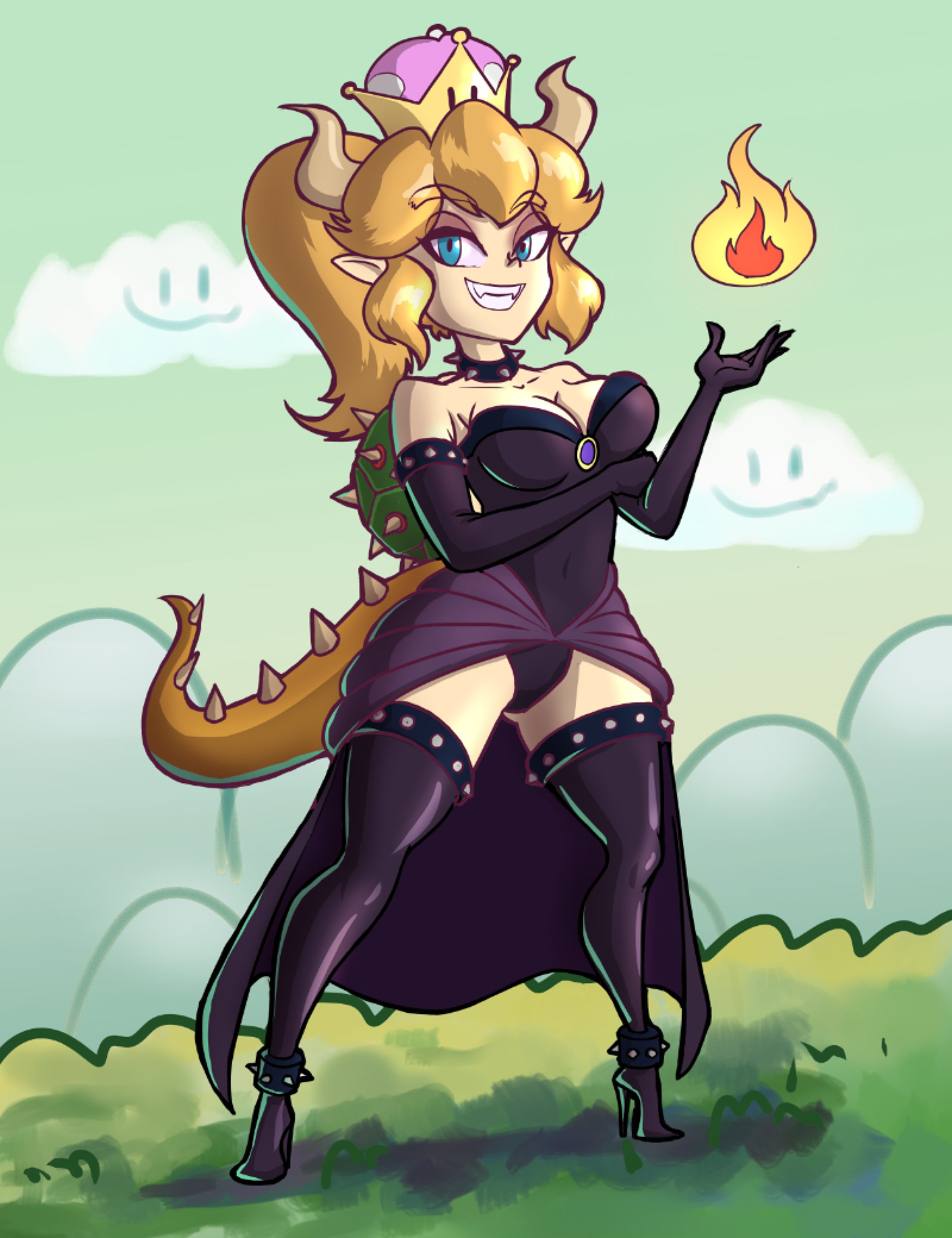
Bowsette is a fan-made, gender-swapped version of the Mario franchise character Bowser.

- "All your base are belong to us" – Badly translated English from the opening cutscene of the European Mega Drive version of the 1989 arcade game Zero Wing. It has become a catchphrase, inspiring videos and other derivative works.
- Among Us – A game made by game studio Innersloth released on Steam in 2018. The game reached internet fame in 2020 due to Twitch streamers and YouTubers playing the game frequently, fueled by at-home boredom during the COVID-19 pandemic. Still images from the game, phrases from the game like "Emergency Meeting" and "Dead body reported" as well as typical gameplay events have influenced internet memes. Other terms like "Sus", "Sussy", "Sussy Baka", "Amogus", and "When the imposter is sus" also became notable memes on social media platforms, later taking on a more ironic usage.
- Angry Birds – A mobile game series made by Rovio Entertainment in December 2009 for the iOS and Nokia app stores, with a Google Play version releasing in October 2010. Since its release, the game has amassed a large following on both the internet and in media for its visuals and simple-to-understand game mechanics of launching a bird from a slingshot. The game has also seen many forms of merchandising, with 30% of Rovio Entertainment's revenue coming from merchandise sales in 2011. One of the largest earlier endeavors was the brand's first licensed theme park in Tampere, Finland that was set to open on 1 May 2012. In 2026, the original game was inducted into the World Video Game Hall of Fame.
- Arrow in the knee – City guards in The Elder Scrolls V: Skyrim would utter the line: "I used to be an adventurer like you, then I took an arrow in the knee". The latter part of this phrase quickly took off as a catchphrase and a snowclone in the form of "I used to X, but then I took an arrow in the knee" with numerous image macros and video parodies created.
- Bird Game 3 – A meme about a fictitious AI-generated game featuring birds as player characters, often depicted as a MOBA or MMO, which became popular in October 2025 on TikTok and other platforms. It is often described as the latest in a long-running series. Some developers were inspired by the meme to begin development on a real game based on the concept.
- Bowsette – A fan-made depiction of the Super Mario character Bowser using Toadette's Super Crown power-up from the Nintendo Switch title New Super Mario Bros. U Deluxe to transform into a lookalike of Princess Peach. The character became popular following a four-panel webcomic posted by a user on Twitter and DeviantArt in September 2018.
- But can it run Crysis? – A question often asked by PC gaming and hardware enthusiasts. When released in 2007, Crysis was extremely taxing on computer hardware, with even the most advanced consumer graphics cards of the time unable to provide satisfactory frame rates when the game was played on its maximum graphical settings. As a result, this question is asked as a way of judging a certain computer's capability at gaming.
- Can it run Doom? – A common joke question with any hardware that has a CPU, due to the vast amount of ports the game has received. Examples of unconventional hardware that Doom has been ported to include a Canon Proxima printer, the VIC-20, the Touch Bar on the 2016 MacBook Pro, a smart fridge, an ATM, a billboard truck, and within the game itself.
- Doomguy and Isabelle – The pairing of Isabelle from the Animal Crossing video game series and Doomguy from the Doom franchise due to the shared release date of Animal Crossing: New Horizons and Doom Eternal.
- Elden Ring – A 2022 video game that spawned multiple memes, such as:
  - Let me solo her – The colloquial name for an Elden Ring player who specializes in fighting Malenia, one of the game's most difficult bosses, and whose character wears no armor but a jar as a helmet. "Let me solo her" became widely acclaimed within the game's online community after volunteering to deal with Malenia on behalf of other players through the game's player summoning feature, and successfully defeating her at least four thousand times without assistance. Videos of the player's performances became popular and widely shared on multiple social news websites. The player's exploits was acknowledged by the game's publisher, and became the subject of fan labor. Let me solo her was awarded PC Gamer's Player of the Year award for 2022.
  - "Maidenless" – a term used by multiple non-player characters to describe the player character. In its original context, it implies that the player character lacks a female guide known as a Finger Maiden, but it has been appropriated by the player community as a joke or insult, who uses it to imply that its recipient lacks a romantic partner.
- Five Nights at Epstein's – A Five Nights at Freddy's fangame involving sex offender Jeffrey Epstein and other people named in the Epstein files. The game sparked controversy after parents found out that their children were playing it.
- Flappy Bird – A free-to-play casual mobile game released on the iOS App Store on 24 May 2013, and on Google Play on 30 January 2014, by indie mobile app developer Dong Nguyen. The game began rapidly rising in popularity in late-December 2013 to January 2014 with up to 50 million downloads by 5 February. On 9 February, Nguyen removed the game from the mobile app stores citing negative effects of the game's success on his health and its addictiveness to players. Following the game's removal from the app stores, numerous clones and derivatives of the game were released with varying similarities to the original game.
- Hugh Morris – A Mii Jester that appears as a love interest for several other women in a trailer for Tomodachi Life: Living the Dream. The character became popular online for his "silly and quirky" personality.
- I Love Bees – An alternate reality game that was spread virally after a one-second mention inside a Halo 2 advertisement. Purported to be a website about honey bees that was infected and damaged by a strange artificial intelligence, done in a disjointed, chaotic style resembling a crashing computer. At its height, over 500,000 people were checking the website every time it updated.
- Lamar Roasts Franklin – A cutscene in the 2013 action-adventure video game Grand Theft Auto V where Lamar Davis, portrayed by comedian Slink Johnson, berates Franklin Clinton, portrayed by actor and former rapper Shawn Fonteno, for Franklin's haircut and his relationship with his girlfriend, ending in Lamar uttering the word "nigga" in a condescending, sing-song voice and giving Franklin the middle finger, much to the latter's chagrin. The cutscene experienced a resurgence in popularity in late 2020 when parodies of the scene were uploaded on YouTube and other video hosting sites. It usually involves Lamar's character model being replaced with various popular culture icons such as Darth Vader, Vegeta, and Snow White among others, with Lamar's dialogue dubbed to account for the characters used. In 2021, Fonteno and Johnson reprised their roles as Franklin and Lamar respectively in a live-action re-enactment of the cutscene. Later that year, Fonteno and Johnson once again reprised their roles in The Contract DLC for Grand Theft Auto Online, complete with a homage to the original roast cutscene.
- Leeroy Jenkins – A World of Warcraft player charges into a high-level dungeon with a distinctive cry of "Leeeeeeeerooooy... Jeeenkins!", ruining the meticulous attack plans of his group and getting them all killed.
- Let's Play – Videos created by video game players that add their commentary and typically humorous reactions atop them playing through a video game. These videos have created a number of internet celebrities who have made significant money through ad revenue sharing, such as PewDiePie who earned over $12 million from his videos in 2015.
- Line Rider – A Flash game where the player draws lines that act as ramps and hills for a small rider on a sled.
- Mafia City – A mobile game that has become infamous for its odd advertising involving a person drastically increasing their stats for doing various mob-related activities, and for the phrase "That's how mafia works".

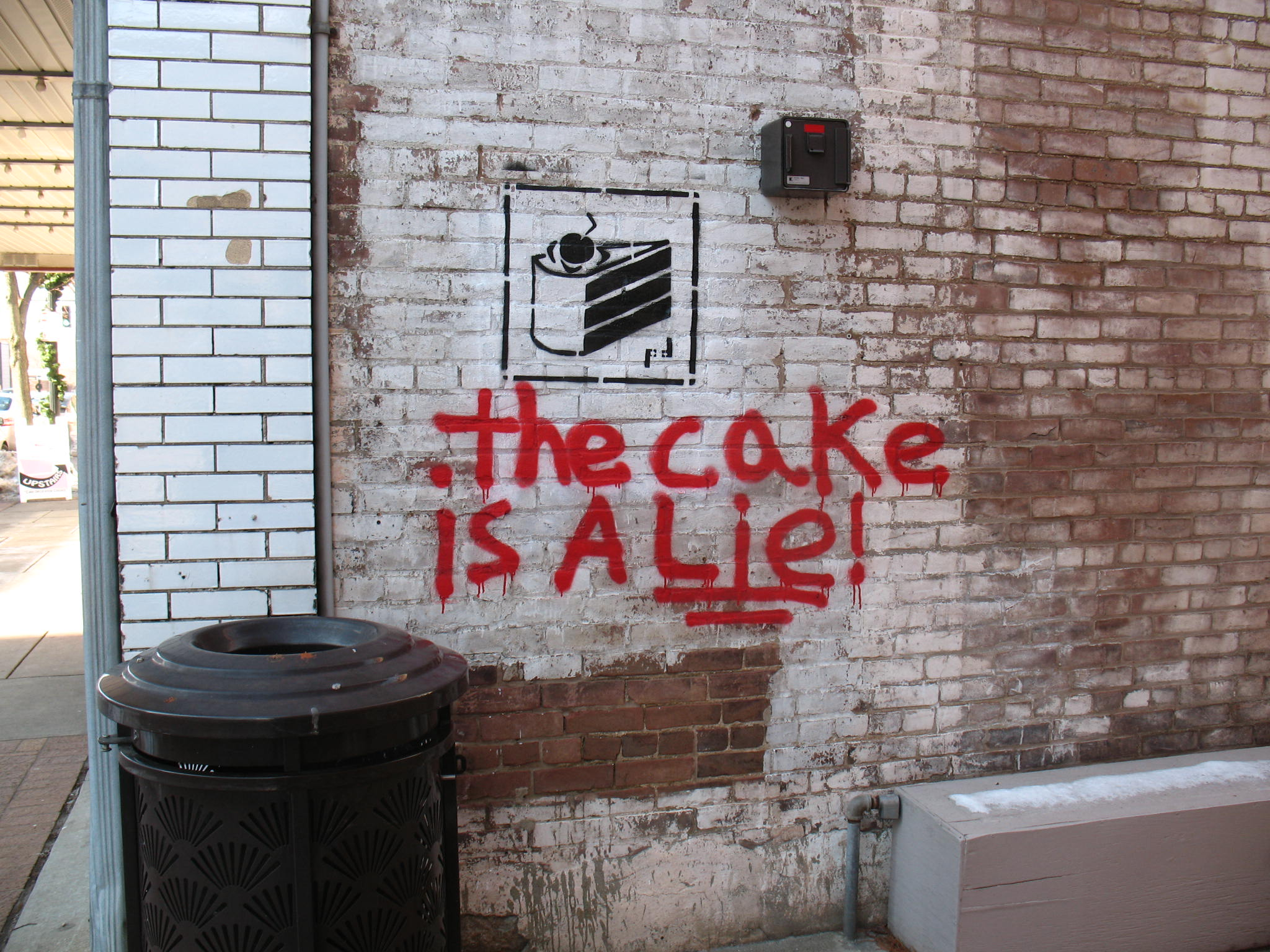
"The cake is a lie", based on the false promise of a Black Forest cake as a reward, is popularized from the video game series Portal.

- Portal – The games in the Portal series introduced several internet memes, including the phrase "the cake is a lie", and the space-obsessed "Space Core" character.
- Press F to pay respects – A prompt for the player to press a button on the PC version of Call of Duty: Advanced Warfare, where the player character would approach the coffin of a fallen comrade in response. The mechanic is repeatedly criticized and ridiculed for both being arbitrary and unnecessary, uninteresting gameplay, as well as being inappropriate to the tone of the funeral the game otherwise intends to convey. The phrase has since become an internet meme in its own right, sometimes used unironically: during the tribute stream for the Jacksonville Landing shooting, viewers posted a single letter "F" in the chat.

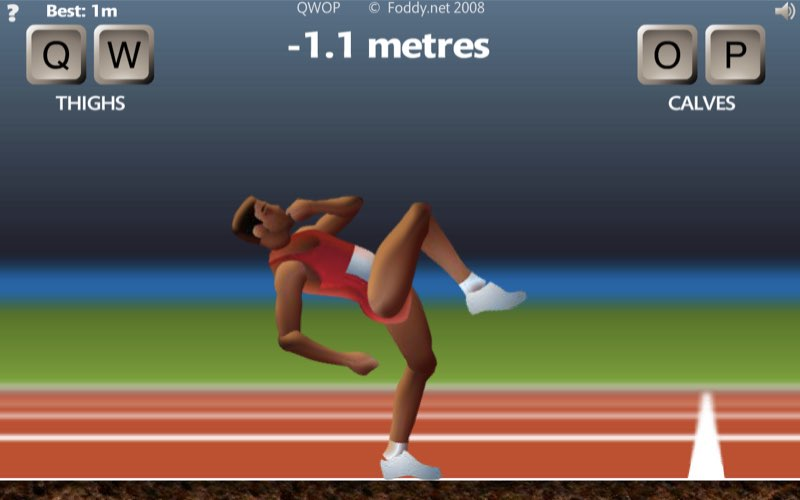
QWOP's title refers to the four keyboard keys used to move the muscles of the sprinter avatar.

- QWOP – A browser-based game requiring the player to control a sprint runner by using the Q, W, O, and P keys to control the runner's legs. The game is notoriously difficult to control, typically leaving the runner character flailing about. The concept developed into memes based on the game, as well as describing real-life mishaps as attributable to QWOP.
- Roblox – A sandbox game that has spawned several memes, such as its "oof" sound.
- Six Degrees of Kevin Bacon – A trivia/parlor game based around linking an actor to Kevin Bacon through a chain of co-starring actors in films, television, and other productions, with the hypothesis that no actor was more than six connections away from Bacon. It is similar to the theory of six degrees of separation or the Erdős number in mathematics. The game was created in 1994, just at the start of the wider spread of internet use, populated further with the creation of movie database sites like IMDb, and since has become a board game and contributed towards the field of network science.
- Sonic the Hedgehog – A video game series created by Sega that has spawned multiple memes, such as the following:
  - Sonic Real-Time Fandubs – The YouTube channel SnapCube has produced a series of improvisational comedy gag dubs of several Sonic titles, including Sonic Adventure 2, Sonic the Hedgehog (2006) and Shadow the Hedgehog, in which their cutscenes are dubbed with new, inaccurate dialogue on purpose. They have themselves earned their own fandom and derivative works based on jokes from the series. The dub over the scene in Sonic Adventure 2 where Doctor Eggman destroys half of the moon featuring an expletive-filled rant from the actor has spawned several memes.
  - Sanic – A purposely misdrawn Sonic that has been referenced by Sega themselves, and used in merchandise;
  - "Ugandan Knuckles" – A meme that gained high popularity thanks to the social game VRChat, where players with a crude Knuckles model asked other players if they "knew da wae" ("know the way"), who their "queen" was, clicking their tongue, and spitting repeatedly.
- Surprised Pikachu – An image of the Pokémon Pikachu with a blank look and an open mouth. It is used as a reaction image to show either shock or lack thereof.
- Touhou Project – A bullet hell video game series entirely developed by Team Shanghai Alice, of which Jun'ya "ZUN" Ōta is the only member. Touhou Project has attracted its own online fandom, and many internet phenomena have come about as a result of the popularity of the series. For example, the promotional Flash videos that accompanied songs by the doujin circle IOSYS, such as "Marisa Stole the Precious Thing" and "Usatei", gained popularity on Nico Nico Douga and YouTube in the late 2000s. The arrangement of the song Bad Apple!! from Touhou Gensokyou ~ Lotus Land Story by the doujin circle Alstroemeria Records featuring nomico and its accompanying fanmade shadow play animation has also become a popular phenomenon associated with Touhou on the internet, with an upload on YouTube reaching 100 million views.
- Twitch Plays Pokémon – An "experiment" and channel created by an anonymous user on Twitch in February 2014. Logged-in viewers to the channel can enter commands in chat corresponding to the physical inputs used in the JRPG video game Pokémon Red. These are collected and parsed by a chat software robot that uses the commands to control the main character in the game, which is then live-streamed from the channel. The stream attracted more than 80,000 simultaneous players with over 10 million views with a week of going live, creating a chaotic series of movements and actions within the game, a number of original memes, and derivative fan art. The combination has been called an entertainment hybrid of "a video game, live video and a participatory experience," which has inspired similar versions for other games.

The logo for Super Mario Galaxy

- U R MR GAY – A message allegedly hidden in the Super Mario Galaxy box art, which appears when each letter not decorated with a star is removed from the art. It was first noticed by a NeoGAF poster in September 2007. Video game journalists have debated as to whether the message was placed on purpose or was simply a humorous coincidence. In Super Mario Galaxy 2, an alleged response to the former's message can be inferred in the title by reading the letters that sparkle in the box art from bottom to top, spelling out "YA I M R U?"
- Untitled Goose Game – A 2019 video game developed by Australian game studio House House, in which the player controls a goose causing mischief in an English village. An early teaser for the game in 2017 led to strong interest in the title, and on release, the game quickly became an internet meme.

An example of a solution from the viral game Wordle, developed by Josh Wardle

- Wordle – A word-guessing game similar to Jotto and Mastermind, where the player has only six tries to guess a five-letter word each day, the game indicating whether letters are in the word or in the correct position. The game became popular over a few weeks after the ability to share results with others via social media was added near the end of 2021. The game's popularity led to The New York Times Company acquiring the game from its creator Josh Wardle at the end of January 2022 for an undisclosed seven-figure sum.

== Images ==
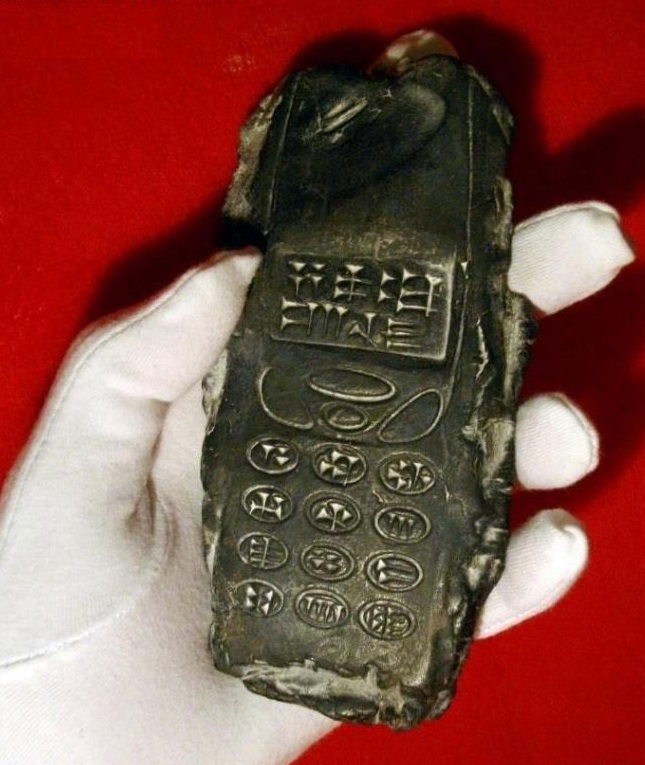
Babylonokia

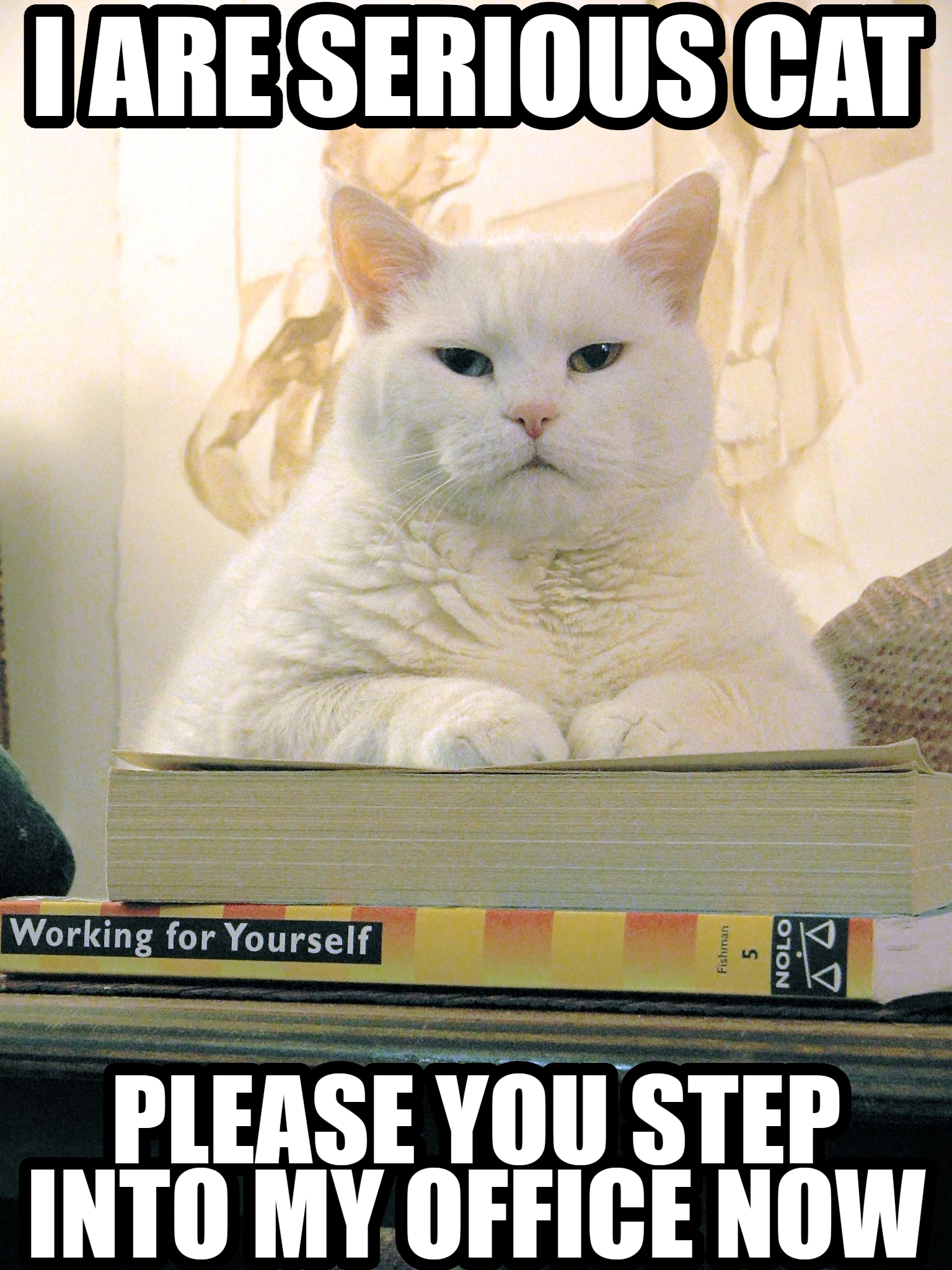
A Lolcat

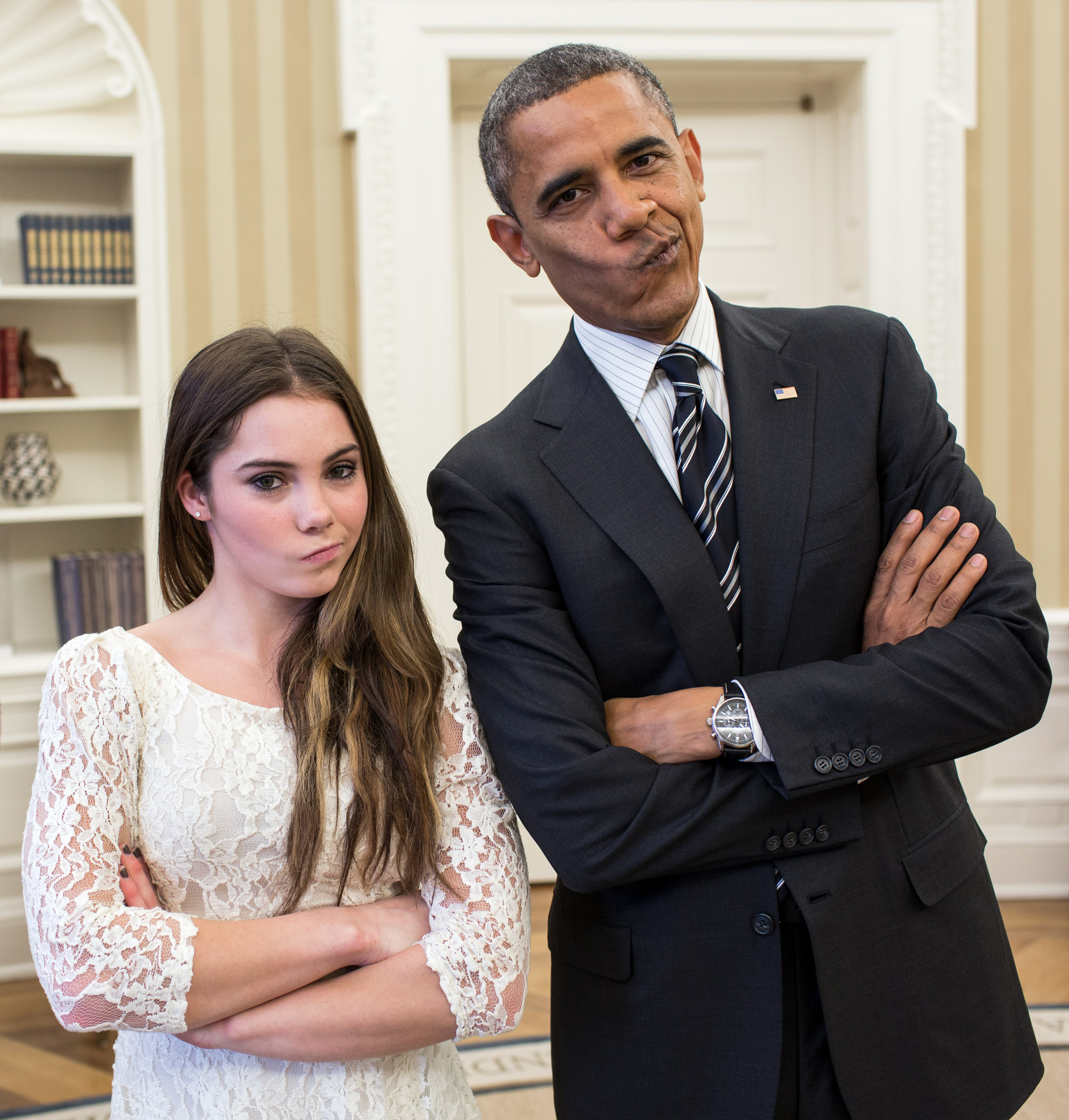
U.S. President Barack Obama jokingly mimics the "McKayla is not impressed" expression in the Oval Office, November 2012.

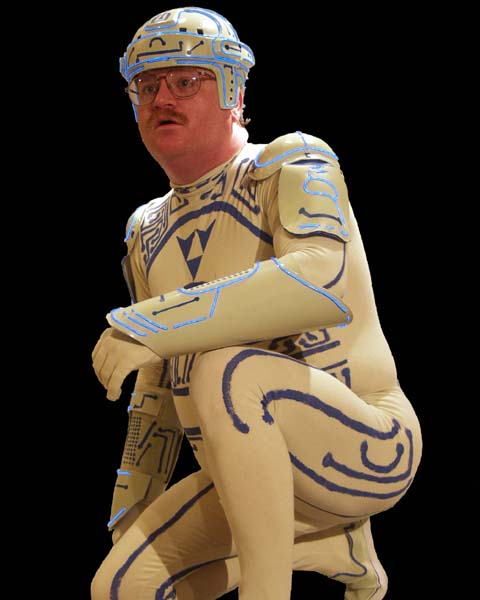
Tron Guy

- Absolute Cinema – a black and white shot of a seated Martin Scorsese holding his hands raised in the air, made by photographer Philip Montgomery for a 2020 The New York Times interview with the phrase superscripted. Both the memed image and the standalone phrase, sometimes also superscripted on other photos, achieved virality, with usage coming in forms of admonished or ironic reaction to flashy moments and mass media content.
- AI art – Since 2022, internet users have used generative AI software including DALL-E, Stable Diffusion, Midjourney and Flux to construct images from text prompts. The resulting images, often shared across social media, are often humorous and can range from uncanny to near-perfect results, sometimes as part of a meme phenomenon, becoming memes or being based on other meme images. Additionally, some AI-generated videos like "Harry Spotter – The boy who lifted" have become internet memes.
- Baby mugging and Baby suiting – MommyShorts blogger Ilana Wiles began posting pictures of babies in mugs, and later adult business suits, both of which led to numerous others doing the same.
- Babylonokia – A clay tablet shaped like a mobile phone, designed by Karl Weingärtner. Fringe scientists and alternative archaeology proponents subsequently misrepresented a photograph of the artwork as showing an 800-year-old archaeological find; that story was popularised in a video on the YouTube channel Paranormal Crucible and led to the object being reported by some press sources as a mystery.
- "Banana for scale" – An internet meme that became popular for humorously measuring lengths of various objects. In this internet phenomenon, other objects juxtaposed with a banana are accompanied with the text "banana for scale".
- Bert is Evil – A satirical website stated that Bert of Sesame Street is the root of many evils. A juxtaposition of Bert and Osama bin Laden subsequently appeared in a real poster in a Bangladesh protest.
- Blinking white guy – An animated GIF of former Giant Bomb video producer Drew Scanlon blinking in surprise, originating from a 2013 video on the website, became an internet meme in 2017. Multiple outlets have noted the versatility of the GIF's use as a reaction.
- Blue waffle – A hoax originating in 2010 claiming to show the effects of an unknown sexually transmitted disease affecting only women, causing severe vaginal infection with a blue discoloration. The disease has been confirmed as false. In Trenton, New Jersey, councilwoman Kathy McBride cited the image in a 2013 city council meeting, not realizing that it was a hoax.
- #BreakTheInternet – The November 2014 issue of Paper included a cover image of Kim Kardashian in a partially nude pose, exposing her buttocks, taken by photographer Jean-Paul Goude. It was captioned "#breaktheinternet", as the magazine desired to set a record in social media response from it. Several other photos from the shoot were also released, including one that mimicked one that Goude took for his book Jungle Fever involving a "campaign incident". Paper's campaign set a record for hits for their site, and the photographs became part of internet memes.
- Crasher Squirrel – A photograph by Melissa Brandts of a squirrel which popped up into a timer-delayed shot of Brandts and her husband while vacationing in Banff National Park, Canada, just as the camera went off. The image of the squirrel has since been added into numerous images on the internet.
- CSI: Miami Puts on Sunglasses – The cold opening for nearly all CSI: Miami episodes ended with star David Caruso as Horatio Caine, in the initial stages of an investigation, putting on his sunglasses and making a quip or pun related to the crime, before the show hard cut to the opening credits, played against the scream of "Yeah!" in The Who's "Won't Get Fooled Again". Image macros of Caruso putting on sunglasses, or similar images for other fictional characters, and the introductory scenes of the CSI: Miami opening became frequent, typically used as response to other puns made on user forums or with the puns and the following "YEAH!" incorporated into the image macro.
- Cursed images – Images (usually photographs) that are perceived as odd or disturbing due to their content, poor quality or both.
- Dat Boi – An animated GIF of a unicycling frog associated with the text "here come dat boi!" that began on Tumblr in 2015 before gaining popularity on Twitter in 2016.
- DashCon Ball Pit – A convention held in July 2014 by users of Tumblr that "imploded" due to a number of financial difficulties and low turnout. During the convention, a portable ball pit was brought into a large empty room. When some premium panels were cancelled, the attendees were offered an extra hour in the ball pit as compensation. The implosion and absurdity of aspects like the ball pit quickly spread through social media.
- Distracted boyfriend – A stock photograph taken in 2015 which went viral as an internet meme in August 2017.
- Dog shaming – Originating on Tumblr, these images feature images of dogs photographed with signs explaining what antics they recently got up to.
- Doge – Images of dogs, typically of the Shiba Inus, overlaid with simple but poor grammatical expressions, typically in the Comic Sans MS font, gaining popularity in late 2013. The meme saw an ironic resurgence towards the end of the decade, and was recognised by multiple media outlets as one of the most influential memes of the 2010s. The meme has also spawned Dogecoin, a form of cryptocurrency.
- Don't talk to me or my son ever again – Images of a subject, be they product or individual, pictured with a smaller version of themself, captioned with the text "don't talk to me or my son ever again". Popular in 2016.
- The Dress – An image of a dress posted to Tumblr that, due to how the photograph was taken, created an optical illusion where the dress would either appear white and gold, or blue and black. Within 48 hours, the post gained over 400,000 notes and was later featured on many different websites.
- Ecce Homo / Ecce Mono / Potato Jesus – An attempt in August 2012 by a local woman to restore Elías García Martínez's aging fresco of Jesus in Borja, Spain led to a botched, amateurish, monkey-looking image, leading to several memes.
- Every time you masturbate... God kills a kitten – An image featuring a kitten being chased by two Domos, and has the tagline "Please, think of the kittens".
- First World problems – A stock image of a woman crying with superimposed text mocking people with trivial complaints compared to that of issues in the Third World.
- Goatse.cx – A shock image of a distended anus.
- Instagram egg – A photograph of an egg on Instagram, which formerly received the most number of likes on both the platform and the highest in any social media.
- Keep Calm and Carry On – A phrasal template or snowclone that was originally a motivational poster produced by the UK government in 1939 intended to raise public morale. It was rediscovered in 2000, became increasingly used during the 2009 global recession, and has spawned various parodies and imitations.
- Listenbourg – An image of a photoshopped map of Europe with a red arrow pointing to the outline of a fictional country adjacent to Portugal and Spain.
- Little Fatty – Starting in 2003, the face of Qian Zhijun, a student from Shanghai, was superimposed onto various other images.
- Lolcat – A collection of humorous image macros featuring cats with misspelled phrases, such as "I Can Has Cheezburger?". The earliest versions of LOLcats appeared on 4chan, usually on Saturdays, which were designated "Caturday", as a day to post photos of cats.
- Manul – A Russian meme that was introduced in 2008. It is typically an image macro with a picture of an unfriendly and stern-looking Pallas's cat (also known as a manul) accompanied by a caption in which the cat invites the viewer to pet it.
- McKayla is not impressed – A Tumblr blog that went viral after taking an image of McKayla Maroney, the American gymnast who won the silver medal in the vault at the 2012 Summer Olympics, on the medal podium with a disappointed look on her face, and photoshopping it into various "impressive" places and situations, e.g. on top of the Great Wall of China and standing next to Usain Bolt.
- Meme Man – Fictional character often featured in surreal memes, depicted as a 3D render of a smooth, bald, and often disembodied and blue-eyed male head.
- Nimoy Sunset Pie – A Tumblr blog that posted mashups combining American actor Leonard Nimoy, sunsets, and pie.
- O RLY? – Originally a text phrase on Something Awful, and then an image macro done for 4chan. Based around a picture of a snowy owl.
- Pepe the Frog – A cartoon frog character from a 2005 web cartoon became widely used on 4chan in 2008, often with the phrase "feels good man". In 2015, the New Zealand government accepted proposals for a new national flag and a flag with Pepe, known as "Te Pepe", was submitted.
- Seriously McDonalds – A photograph apparently showing racist policies introduced by McDonald's. The photograph, which is a hoax, went viral, especially on Twitter, in June 2011.
- Spider-Man Pointing at Spider-Man – An image of the episode "Double Identity" of the 1967 TV series Spider-Man where the character Spider-Man and a criminal with the same costume point at each other. It is often used online when a person coincidentally acts or looks like another person. The meme was referenced in the post-credit scene of Spider-Man: Into the Spider-Verse and a real-life version with three Spider-Man actors – Tom Holland, Andrew Garfield and Tobey Maguire – was tweeted by Marvel to announce the release of Spider-Man: No Way Home on 4K UHD and Blu-ray.
- Stonks – An image featuring Meme Man in a suit against an image of the stock market, used to highlight or satirize absurd topics related to finance or the economy.
- Success Kid – An image of a baby who is clenching his fist while featuring a determined look on his face.
- Throwback Thursday – The trend of posting older, nostalgic photos on Thursdays under the hashtag #ThrowbackThursday or #TBT.
- Trash Doves – A sticker set of a purple bird for iOS, Facebook messenger, Facebook comments, and other messaging apps created by Syd Weiler. The animated headbanging pigeon from the sticker set started to go viral in Thailand and it became globally viral on social media.
- Tron Guy – Jay Maynard, a computer consultant, designed a Tron costume, complete with skin-tight spandex and light-up plastic armor, in 2003 for Penguicon 1.0 in Detroit, Michigan. The internet phenomenon began when an article was posted to Slashdot, followed by Fark, including images of this costume.
- Vancouver Riot Kiss – An image supposedly of a young couple lying on the ground kissing each other behind a group of rioters during the riots following the Vancouver Canucks' Stanley Cup loss to the Boston Bruins on 15 June 2011. The couple, later identified as Australian, Scott Jones, and local resident, Alexandra Thomas, were not actually kissing but Jones was consoling Thomas after being knocked down by a police charge.
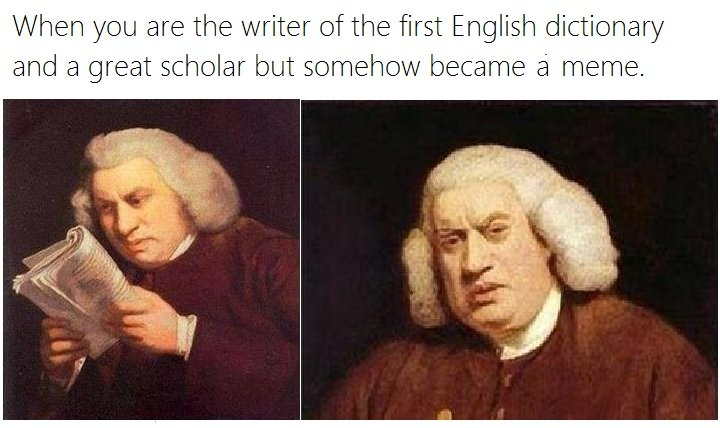
  An example of the "What the fuck did I just read?" meme
- What the fuck did I just read? – Two side-by-side portraits of English lexicographer Samuel Johnson which indicate bewilderment.

- White rabbit pointing at a clock – An illustration depicting the Alice In Wonderland character White Rabbit holding up a pocket watch, appearing to scold the viewer that they are late (or running out of time).
- Wojak – Also known as "Feels Guy", a bald male character with a sad expression on his face, often used as a reaction image to represent feelings such as melancholy, regret or loneliness. It has been used to convey different feelings by means of memetic transformation and modification into many various unique forms, all with different meanings. Some represent specific ideas or roles in certain situations, such as the NPC meme, which mocks supposed groupthink and a lack of individuality among a group of people. It has also spawned many derived characters, all based on the original but used to represent different emotions.
- Woman yelling at a cat – A screenshot of the members of the television show The Real Housewives of Beverly Hills Taylor Armstrong and Kyle Richards showing Armstrong shouting and pointing with the finger, followed by a photo of a confused cat (identified as Smudge) sitting behind a table with food. The meme emerged in mid-2019, when Twitter users joined the photos and included texts that looked like a mockery of the cat to the angry woman.
- Worst person you know – A satirical article by ClickHole with a picture of Josep Maria García.
- Wood Sitting on a Bed – An image of a nude man sitting on a bed that gained notoriety at the beginning of the COVID-19 pandemic.
- "You are not immune to propaganda." – A glitch art representation of Garfield, with the caption "You are not immune to propaganda" surrounding it.

== Music and sounds ==
- "Johnny Johnny Yes Papa" – A children's nursery rhyme series.
- "The Most Mysterious Song on the Internet" – A song recorded on an audio cassette off German radio in the early 1980s, the artist and song title of which remained unknown for many years, despite intensive search efforts by internet users. In November 2024, the song was identified as "Subways of Your Mind" by the German band FEX.
- "Megalovania" – An instrumental video game song composed by Toby Fox. It was described by Polygon's Palmer Haasch as having "consistent presence in internet game culture of the late 2010s".
- "Sigma Boy" – A song by Russian bloggers 11-year-old Betsy and 12-year-old Maria Yankovskaya. German TikToker Streichbruder (@simonbth1) started a trend in which he put the song on at full volume in public transport. It was part of a larger trend where bloggers go to a public place and blast silly songs that they would normally be ashamed of listening to in front of other people. The song itself topped the Viral 50 Global Chart.
- Vuvuzelas – The near-constant playing of the buzz-sounding vuvuzela instrument during games of the 2010 World Cup in South Africa led to numerous vuvuzela-based memes, including YouTube temporarily adding a vuvuzela effect that could be added to any video during the World Cup.
- Yanny or Laurel – An audio illusion where individuals hear either the word "Yanny" or "Laurel".

== People ==
- Brad's Wife – On 27 February 2017, Brad Byrd of Harrison County, Indiana posted on Cracker Barrel's Facebook page, asking them why they fired his wife, Nanette, after 11 years of service. The intense and serious nature of the post drew viral attention, and internet users began semi-sarcastically demanding answers, using hashtags such as #BradsWife and #JusticeForBradsWife. This meme was notable for being popular with baby boomers as well as younger internet users. After the post was about a week old, several corporations jumped on the viral bandwagon and began to publicly send job offers to Nanette Byrd.
- Brian Peppers – In 2005, a photo surfaced of a man named Brian Peppers, noted for his appearance, which suggests Apert syndrome or Crouzon syndrome. Found on the Ohio sex offender registry website, the photo gained traction after being shared on website YTMND. Peppers died in 2012 at the age of 43.
- Florida Man – Crimes involving bizarre behavior, perpetrated by men from the state of Florida.
- Hide the Pain Harold – Hungarian model András István Arató became the subject of a meme in 2011, due to his seemingly fake smile as the model in stock images. The meme depicts photos of Arató smiling, while viewers believe the smile masks serious sorrow and pain, hence the name "Hide the Pain Harold".
- Islamic Rage Boy – A series of photos of Shakeel Bhat, a Muslim activist whose face became a personification of angry Islamism in the western media. The first photo dates back to his appearance in 2007 at a rally in Srinigar, the capital of Indian-administered Kashmir. Several other photos in other media outlets followed, and by November 2007, there were over one million hits for "Islamic Rage Boy" on Google and his face appeared on boxer shorts and bumper stickers.
- Krzysztof Kononowicz – A Polish man who became a phenomenon of the Polish internet in 2006 after appearing in the debate of candidates for the president of Białystok.
- Salt Bae – Turkish chef and restaurateur Nusret Gökçe earned fame in 2017 for his camera-friendly approach to preparing and seasoning meat, including a video in 2017 in which he sprinkles salt, sparkling in the sunlight, onto a steak. Gökçe's approach has been compared to dinner theater, in that his actual finished product is secondary to the performance.
- Tomer White Glasses – Israeli celebrity who became acknowledged during the 2026 Iran war, as he kept being photographed in every news report that was broadcast, mainly from Habima Square.

== Politics ==
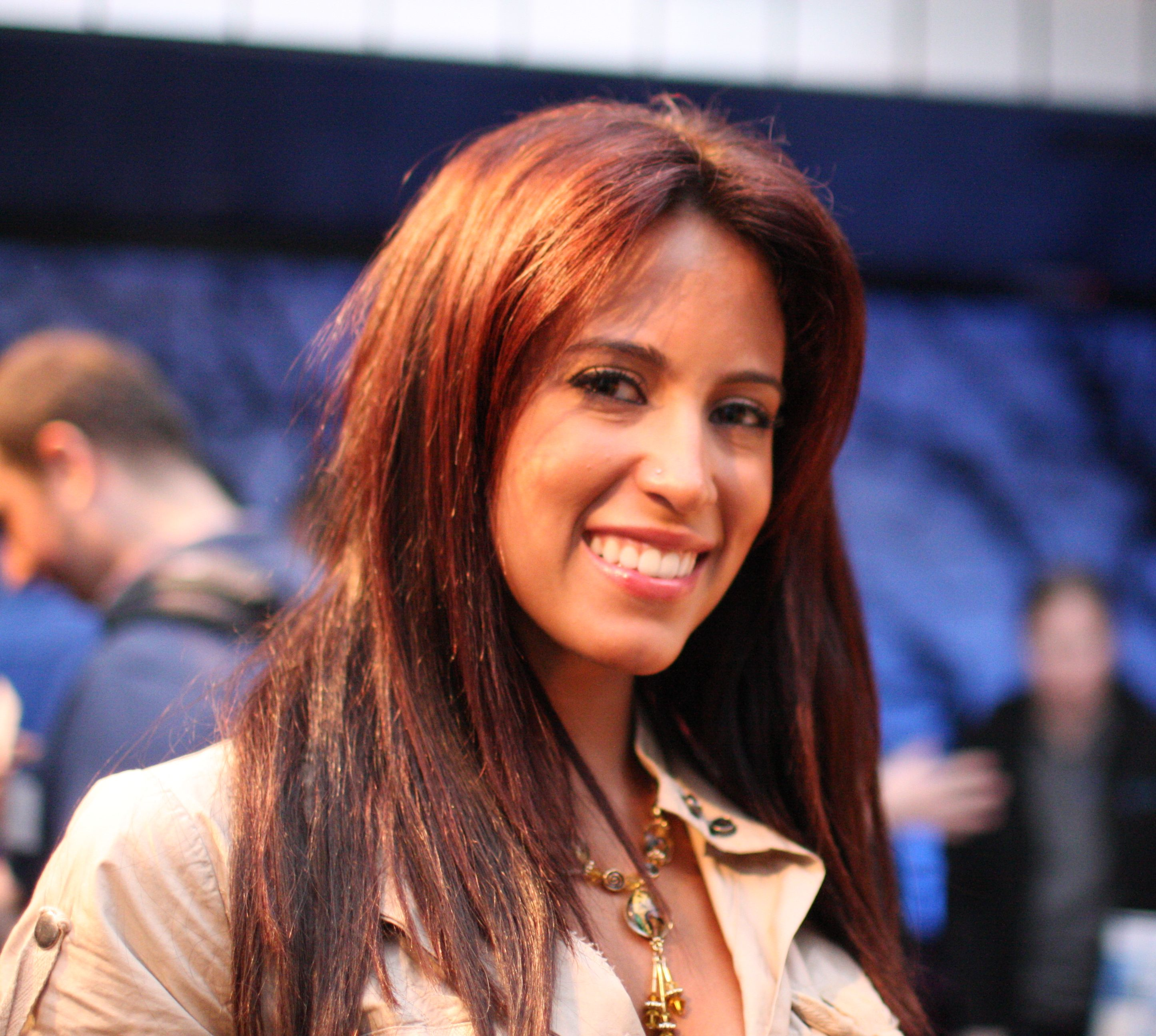
Amber Lee Ettinger, a.k.a. "Obama Girl"

- Arrest of Vladimir Putin – A viral video showing the mock arrest of Vladimir Putin and his trial.
- Barack Obama vs. Mitt Romney – A fictitious rap battle between 2012 election candidates Barack Obama and Mitt Romney. As of October 2020, the video has over 150 million views.
- Bernie or Hillary? – A political poster that compares the positions of Hillary Clinton and Bernie Sanders on certain issues. It was typically used by Sanders supporters to make fun of Clinton's attempts to seem relatable to the voter base while they perceived Sanders to be more knowledgeable and in-depth on the issues. However, some critiqued the meme by saying that it played into sexist stereotypes.
- Bush shoeing incident – During a press conference in 2008, Muntadhar al-Zaidi threw both of his shoes at then-president George W. Bush. Afterwards, various Flash-based browser games and gifs were created to poke fun of the incident.
- Charlie Kirk – An American right-wing political activist. Various memes pertaining to him arose following his assassination in September 2025. These include Kirkification, AI-generated images swapping his face onto unlikely figures, as well as "We Are Charlie Kirk", a presumably AI-generated song created as a tribute to Kirk.
- Crush on Obama – A music video by Amber Lee Ettinger that circulated during the 2008 United States presidential election. As well as its sequels, the video caught the attention of bloggers, mainstream media, and other candidates, and achieved 12.5 million views on YouTube by 1 January 2009.
- Dean scream – Former Governor of Vermont Howard Dean's concession speech following the 2004 New Hampshire Democratic primaries included Dean rattling off a list of states in escalating volume as crowd noise rose, resulting in increasingly distorted audio and culminating in an unusual "yeehaw" scream. It was one of the first political internet memes.
- Delete your account – A phrase used on Twitter to criticize the opinions of opponents. On 9 June 2016, Hillary Clinton tweeted this phrase towards Donald Trump. Afterwards, the tweet has become her most retweeted tweet of all time.
- Don't Tase Me, Bro! – A 2007 incident at a campus talk by Senator John Kerry where a student yelled his now-infamous phrase while being restrained by police.
- Eastwooding – After Clint Eastwood's speech at the 2012 Republican National Convention, in which he spoke to an empty chair representing President Barack Obama, photos were posted by users on the internet of people talking to empty chairs, with various captions referring to the chair as either Obama or Eastwood.
- "Epstein didn't kill himself" – A bait-and-switch joke originating on the app iFunny in October 2019, two months after his death in August. Many memes alleged involvement of Donald Trump, Hillary Clinton, or other notable figures. The meme saw mainstream popularity in late 2019, being unexpectedly snuck into cable news interviews by guests such as on FOX News and MSNBC. It was also referenced by Ricky Gervais at the 77th Golden Globe Awards due to the alleged connections between Epstein and people in the Hollywood film industry.
- Forest raking – After U.S. President Donald Trump's comments that Finland spent "a lot of time on raking and cleaning its forest floor", Finnish people began circulating satirical images of themselves raking the forests to stop wildfires.
- JD Vance edits – A series of images where JD Vance is humorously edited.
- Jesusland map – A map created shortly after the 2004 U.S. presidential election that satirizes the red/blue states scheme by dividing the United States and Canada into "The United States of Canada" and "Jesusland".
- Joe Biden – There are numerous iterations of President Joe Biden as a meme. The portrayal of Biden in The Onion was popular on the Internet and influenced other memes about him, as well as his broader public image. After Donald Trump won the 2016 U.S. presidential election, images of Biden as the "Biden Bro" or "Prankster Joe Biden" began circulating online. In these memes, Biden was paired with Barack Obama and captioned with various fictional conversations planning pranks and jokes on the president-elect. Biden is portrayed as the immature prankster of the duo, with Obama as his exasperated straight man.
- Kekistan – A fictional country created by 4chan members that has become a political meme and online movement used notably by the alt-right.
- Ladies and Gentlemen, We Got Him – A quote said by American diplomat Paul Bremer during a 2003 press conference announcing the capture of Saddam Hussein. The scene, coupled with audio from the Breakbot song "Baby I'm Yours", began to be widely used with clips of people being apprehended or caught off-guard in some fashion, often in the context of FBI operations.
- Miss Me Yet? – Billboards that appeared on American highways in early 2010 that featured George W. Bush asking "Miss me yet?". Inspired a series of themed merchandise from online agencies such as CafePress.
- Mug shot of Donald Trump – A mugshot of the U.S. president, Donald Trump, taken in August 2023 after he was voluntarily taken to the Fulton County Jail.
- Series of tubes – A phrase originally coined as an analogy by Senator Ted Stevens to describe the internet in the context of opposing network neutrality. His statement was later remixed on YouTube and YTMND.
- Strong – A political advertisement issued by Texas Governor Rick Perry presidential campaign in December 2011 for the 2012 Republican Party presidential primaries. The video was parodied and became one of the most disliked videos on YouTube.
- Ted Cruz–Zodiac meme – A mock conspiracy theory suggesting that American Senator and Presidential candidate Ted Cruz was the Zodiac Killer, an unidentified Californian serial killer of the late 1960s and early 1970s (when Cruz was either not born or, at the latest, a toddler).
- Thanks Obama – A sarcastic expression used by critics of President Barack Obama to blame personal troubles and inconveniences on public policies supported or enacted by the administration.
- That one friend that's too woke – a 2024 viral TikTok video in which the author of the video acts as a woman who interrupts her off-camera friends, who are laughing at a meme, to express concern about the U.S. possibly going to war and the upcoming presidential election, which is often used as a reaction image in relation to individuals who bring up dire political situations during mundane conversations. The meme has been criticized for its perceived apoliticism.
- This Land – A Flash animation produced by JibJab featuring cartoon faces of George W. Bush and John Kerry singing a parody of "This Land Is Your Land" that spoofs the 2004 United States presidential election. The video became a viral hit and viewed by over 100 million, leading to the production of other JibJab hits, including Good to Be in D.C. and Big Box Mart.
- "Running through fields of wheat" – In 2017, then UK Prime Minister Theresa May was asked by interviewer Julie Etchingham what the "naughtiest thing" she had done as a child was. May responded that she and her friend "used to run through the fields of wheat", something "the farmers weren't too pleased about". The statement became the subject of mockery and a meme.
- Winnie the Pooh comparison to Xi Jinping – In 2013, a still image of China Chinese leader Xi Jinping meeting with US President Barack Obama was compared to Winnie the Pooh and Tigger. As comparisons of Pooh to Xi persist, the government tightened its censorship to suppress the trend. The comparisons are not limited to internet users in China. The phenomenon has been reported to occur in the Philippines.

== Videos ==
- "And I oop" – A video of drag queen Jasmine Masters stopping a story to say the phrase "and I oop" after accidentally hitting himself in the testes.
- Elsagate – A controversy surrounding children's YouTube videos in the late 2010s and 2020s. Thousands of videos featuring characters from popular children's media in sexual or violent scenarios were uploaded by anonymous accounts and circumvented child safety algorithms. Beginning in late 2017, the existence and proliferation of these videos became widely publicized.
- Fruit Love Island – An AI-generated shortform web series published on TikTok and YouTube in March 2026. The series amassed over 300 million views, but has faced widespread criticism due to its perceived low quality and its usage of the Love Island brand.
- "Get Out of My Car" – An animated video created by Psychicpebbles, which uses the real audio of a man yelling at a woman to get out of his car.
- Italian brainrot – A series of videos revolving around AI-generated images of surrealist animals. These videos are accompanied by a nonsensical Italian voiceover.
- Savage Babies – Also known as the Most Savage Babies in Human History, a meme popular in 2016 that uses clips from the Indian children's YouTube channel VideoGyan 3D Rhymes, namely their series of nursery rhymes "Zool Babies". The videos are heavily distorted and given edgy, ironic titles that exaggerate the meaning of the video, such as "Five Little Babies Dressed as Pilots" becoming "Savage Babies Cause 9/11".
- YouTube Poop – Video mashups in which users deconstruct and piece together video for psychedelic or absurdist effect.

== Other phenomena ==
- 6-7 – An internet meme based on Skrilla's song "Doot Doot (6 7)", with its popularity built around the lyric "6–7." It is believed the lyric refers to 67th Street in Chicago, but as a meme, it does not have a fixed meaning and is simply a catchy phrase used in a variety of contexts. It is often tied to LaMelo Ball and the "6–7 Kid".
- Ben Drowned – A self-published three-part multimedia ARG web serial and web series inspired by creepypasta and The Legend of Zelda: Majora's Mask, created by Alexander D. Hall.
- Binod – An internet fad which became popular in India in 2020. It originated from a comment by a user with the screen name 'Binod', who had added only the word 'Binod' as a comment. This was followed by a video by Slayy Point, mocking "Binod" and YouTube comment sections in general. People started spamming the word 'Binod' across social media, primarily in YouTube comments and stream chats. A number of organisations also posted memes, including Netflix India, Twitter and Tinder. Paytm temporarily changed its Twitter name to 'Binod'.
- Chuck Norris facts – Satirical factoids about martial artist and actor Chuck Norris that became popular culture after spreading through the internet.
- Clanker – Derogatory term for robots and artificial intelligence software.
- Creepypasta – Urban legends or scary stories circulating on the internet, many times revolving around specific videos, pictures, or video games. The term "creepypasta" is a mutation of the term "copypasta": a short, readily available piece of text that is easily copied and pasted into a text field. "Copypasta" is derived from "copy/paste", and in its original sense commonly referred to presumably initially sincere text (e.g. a blog or forum post) perceived by the copy/paster as undesirable or otherwise preposterous, which was then copied and pasted to other sites as a form of trolling. In the pre-internet era, such material regularly circulated as faxlore.
- DignifAI – A 4chan-linked campaign to use AI tools to make women in photos look more modestly dressed. The trend is the opposite of deepfake pornography in that it is used to add clothes rather than remove them, and it has been used as a form of slut-shaming.
- Freecycling – The exchange of unwanted goods via the internet.
- Get stick bugged lol – A video clip of a stick insect swaying as bait-and-switch meme similar to Rickrolling, in which an irrelevant video would unexpectedly transition to the clip when the stickbug revealed with the caption "Get stick bugged LOL".
- Have You Seen This Man? – A viral website that emerged on the internet in the late 2000s, claiming to gather data about a mysterious figure only known as This Man that appears in dreams of people who never saw him before.
- Hou De Kharcha, a meme in Marathi
- "i am lonely will anyone speak to me" – A thread created on MovieCodec.com's forums, which has been described as the "Web's Top Hangout for Lonely Folk" by Wired magazine.
- Internet checkpoint – A phenomenon that originated on YouTube in 2012 after a video upload by Taia777 of stretched out game soundtrack and edited images led to viewers commenting "Checkpoints" about their life in the comments section. The term is a reference to video game automatic save points.
- Ligma joke – A meme to set up a crude joke.
- Malfoid – Art and fanfiction depicting a gender-swapped version of Draco Malfoy from the Harry Potter franchise. While depictions of female versions of Malfoy have existed since the 2000s, the trend saw a sharp rise in popularity, particularly among the alt-right, and the name "Malfoid" (a portmanteau of "Malfoy" and "foid", a derogatory slang term for women) was coined in late September 2026.
- Martian script – A form of written Chinese which replaces standard graphs with unorthodox variations like the use of symbols, visually similar foreign scripts, the addition of radicals, and characters with added or removed strokes.
- Most Awesomest Thing Ever – A defunct website that randomly paired two objects, celebrities and activities, and asked viewers to decide their favourite. The ultimate goal of the project was to see what viewers considered the most "awesomest". At the website's closure in 2022, teleportation was ranked number 1.

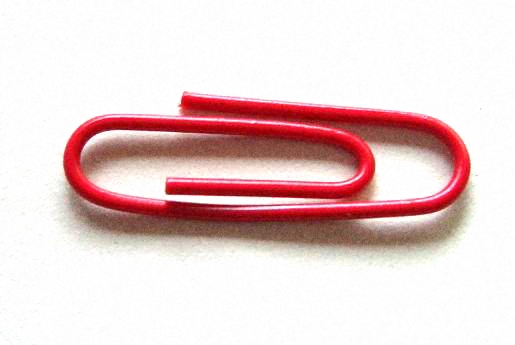
The paperclip that Kyle MacDonald bartered to buy a house, after 14 trade-ups

- "Netflix and chill" – An English language slang term using an invitation to watch Netflix together as a euphemism for sex, either between partners or casually as a booty call. The phrase has been popularized through the internet.
- Omission of New Zealand from maps – New Zealand is often excluded from world maps, which has caught the attention of New Zealander users on the internet.
- One red paperclip – The story of a Canadian blogger who bartered his way from a red paperclip to a house in a year's time.
- Planking – Also known as the Lying Down Game. An activity consisting of lying in a face down position, with palms touching the body's sides and toes touching the ground, sometimes in bizarre locations. Some compete to find the most unusual and original location in which to play.
- Reality shifting – A mental phenomenon similar to lucid dreaming or maladaptive daydreaming that appeared on TikTok, in which practitioners believe they travel to alternate realities, usually fictional (for example the Wizarding World of the Harry Potter franchise).
- Rickrolling – An internet prank in which a video unexpectedly plays the music video for "Never Gonna Give You Up" by Rick Astley instead of what was advertised.
- SCP Foundation – A creative writing website that contains thousands of fictitious containment procedures for paranormal objects captured by the in-universe SCP Foundation, a secret organization tasked with securing and documenting objects that violate natural law or pose a threat to humanity's perception of normalcy and further existence. The website has inspired numerous spin-off works, including a stage play and video games such as SCP – Containment Breach.
- Siren Head – A fictional cryptid which has an air raid siren as a head, created by horror artist Trevor Henderson. It has accumulated a fan following which has spawned numerous pieces of fan works and fan-made video games. Many video edits have depicted Siren Head playing various songs over a populated area. Siren Head has been erroneously recognized as an SCP, most notably when the character was briefly submitted to the SCP Foundation Wiki as SCP-6789; the entry was removed after Henderson and site users expressed intention to keep Siren Head independent of the SCP Foundation Wiki. Another entry, SCP-5987, was inspired by the character name and the controversy from the deleted entry.
- Slender Man or Slenderman – A creepypasta meme and urban-legend fakelore tale created on 8 June 2009, by user Victor Surge on Something Awful as part of a contest to edit photographs to contain "supernatural" entities and then pass them off as legitimate on paranormal forums. The Slender Man gained prominence as a frightening malevolent entity: a tall thin man wearing a suit and lacking a face with "his" head only being blank, white, and featureless. After the initial creation, numerous stories and videos were created by fans of the character. Slender Man was later adapted into a video game in 2012 and became more widely known. There is also a film released in 2018 to negative reviews.
- Smash or Pass – A game in which players decide whether they would hypothetically "smash" (have sex with) someone or "pass" (choose not to).
- Spiders Georg – A meme which imagines that the (untrue) statistic that the "average person eats 3 spiders a year" is the result of a statistical error caused by the incorporation of "Spiders Georg", a fictional character who resides in a cave and eats over ten thousand spiders every day, into the study from which this conclusion was drawn. The meme originated with a Tumblr post by user Max Lavergne, and has inspired many derivative works about the character. Variations of the meme have imagined other characters named "Georg" to explain other real or imagined statistics and beliefs.
- Steak and Blowjob Day – A meme suggesting that a complementary holiday to Valentine's Day, primarily for men, takes place on 14 March each year.
- Storm Area 51 – A joke event created on Facebook to "storm" the highly classified Area 51 military base, with over 1,700,000 people claiming to be attending and another 1,300,000 claiming they were "interested" in going. 1,500 people arrived in the vicinity of Area 51 the day of the event, 20 September 2019, only one of whom actually breached the boundary and was quickly escorted off the premises.
- Surreal memes – A type of meme that are artistically bizarre in appearance and whose humor derives from their absurd style. Certain qualities and characters, such as Meme Man, Mr. Orange, and a minimalist style, are frequent markers of the meme.
- The Backrooms – A fictional location invented in a 2019 4chan thread. The Backrooms are typically portrayed as an impossibly large extradimensional complex of empty rooms. They are one of the best-known examples of the liminal space aesthetic. In 2026, the Backrooms were adapted into a film, directed by YouTuber Kane Parsons and produced by A24.
- The Million Dollar Homepage – A website conceived in 2005 by Alex Tew, a student from Wiltshire, England, to raise money for his university education. The home page consists of a million pixels arranged in a 1000 × 1000 pixel grid. The image-based links on it were sold for $1 per pixel in 10 × 10 blocks.
- The Undertaker vs. Mankind – A copypasta where at the end of a comment of an irrelevant topic, the event is referenced.
- Vibe Check – Generally ascribed as a spiritual evaluation of a person's mental and emotional state.
- "Why are you gay?" – The opening question asked in a 2012 televised interview between Ugandan journalist Simon Kwagga Njala and LGBT rights activist Pepe Julian Onziema, which went viral as a soundbite and reaction image in 2019.
- Willy's Chocolate Experience – An unlicenced event based on the Charlie and the Chocolate Factory franchise held in Glasgow, Scotland. Due to the misleading AI-generated advertisements and its sparsely decorated warehouse location, images of the event went viral. Notable viral images include a dispirited woman dressed as an Oompa-Loompa and an original character called "The Unknown".

== See also ==
- List of internet phenomena in China
- List of internet phenomena in Pakistan
- Cats and the internet
- Index of internet-related articles
- Internet culture
- Internet meme
- Know Your Meme
- List of YouTubers
- Outline of the internet
- Urban legends and myths
- Usenet personality
- Viral phenomenon
