= Internet checkpoint =

Internet phenomenon and art form

Internet checkpoints or internet pitstops are a phenomenon that began in the early 2010s, primarily on the video sharing website YouTube. Users of the website used the comment section of uploaded videos to identify that moment in time. Comparisons of this phenomenon have been made to 'temporal landmarks', stepping stones between past, present and future. Videos with music, often in the style of vaporwave or lo-fi ambience would be auto-played to users, with their comment sections used for personal reflections, each comment starting with the phrase "checkpoint". This word being a reference to checkpoints in video games, where the game is automatically saved and respawns can occur.

== Known examples ==
Edited art from Donkey Kong Country 2: Diddy's Kong Quest used by Taia777 in their original 2012 YouTube checkpoint upload

=== Internet Checkpoint ===
In 2012, a video titled Japanese: "とげとげタルめいろ・スーパードンキーコング2"", lit. 'Thorny Barrel Labyrinth Super Donkey Kong 2' was uploaded to YouTube by a channel named 'Taia777'. The video featured the track "Stickerbush Symphony" along with visuals from the video game Donkey Kong Country 2: Diddy's Kong Quest. Neither the video or channel had any description or profile picture respectively. These videos were often recommended to viewers by YouTube's internal algorithm.

==== Comment section phenomenon ====
The comments sections of the videos uploaded by Taia777 consisted of viewers writing about milestones, either upcoming or recent, personal or impersonal, usually beginning with 'Checkpoint:'. It is unknown when this started. This phenomenon correlates directly to video game automatic save points, with the viewer taking the place of the character within the video game. Documented examples of these checkpoint comments include:

- 'Checkpoint: I'm an adult now but I really don't feel like one.'
- 'Checkpoint: Finally quit a job I hated and started doing something I love. Game saved.'
- 'Checkpoint: Not too long ago, I graduated from Community College with an associates degree.'

==== Copyright takedown and archiving ====
Videos containing video game music and visuals were taken down by YouTube in 2021, due to copyright and terms of service violations involving both YouTube and Nintendo. As a result of this action, all checkpoint comments left on Taia777's videos were lost. Some time later, Taia777's YouTube channel was terminated from YouTube entirely. Prior to the takedown of Taia777's video and channel, archive enthusiast Rebane2001 had saved all of Taia777's videos and their comments sections. Following the loss of these videos, Rebane2001 uploaded the archived content to her personal website and released files in ZIP format on Reddit. These were then published onto a dedicated website designed to ensure accessibility.

=== Thesoundof.love ===
A website was set up by Filipino artist Chiara Amisola in 2022, allowing people to view curated YouTube comments above a corresponding video or still images of album covers when a song is playing. Music makes up the majority of the website's entries.

== Commentary ==
=== Media coverage ===
The checkpoint phenomenon has been discussed and analysed by multiple outlets. Nicolas Framont writing for Frustration Magazine described the phenomenon as a type of misnomer to Proust's madeleine from Marcel Proust's novel In Search of Lost Time. Framont stated that invitations to create "checkpoints" are "rare", noting that people are "instead asked to grow" and that "looking to the past is seen as a sign of weakness"; he characterised internet checkpoints as going "against this injunction". David-Julien Rahmil of L'ADN made note of the phenomenon being "relatively little identified by Internet users themselves". Quoting a video by YouTuber Daryl Talks Games, Rahmil reasoned that "it was the presence of this video titled in Japanese...which gave birth to this totally organic phenomenon. This idea of the checkpoint will not remain haphazard for very long. Playlists and videos stamped 'Internet checkpoint' are already flourishing on the Web."

=== Academic research ===
Richy Srirachanikorn examined the phenomenon in an academic study, analysing different parts of the phenomenon individually, including the videos and comments sections of Taia777's YouTube channel. Srirachanikorn defined checkpoint comments as "recycle[d] social time expressions that institutions produce", which "strangers can quickly relate with one another with souvenirs and postcards". Anya Savina, interviewing author Ruby Justice Thélot, emphasised the importance of physicality, explaining from a personal point of view that "it's the materiality of that experience...to understand a memory requires presence. Any attempt for me to separate it from that ontological requirement of being there is essentially a travesty. I end the importance of being online essay with 'You had to be there, you had to be online.'" Describing the regulation of the internet by the large corporations, Framont concluded that ""Internet checkpoints" are part of these islands of resistance and freedom."
