= List of internet phenomena in Pakistan =

The following phenomena specific to the internet within Pakistan significantly influenced Pakistan and other countries' internet culture.

== Yeh bik gayi hai gormint ==
In July 2016, an elderly Pakistani woman from Karachi said this (lit. This government is sold out) while being interviewed by Waqt News, and it became the biggest meme in Pakistan in 2016. The woman went on to say that, "saare milke hum ko pagal bana rahay hain" (together these people are deceiving us), after which she spewed a list of expletives. The video of the woman going on an abusive rant against the government went viral, and memes followed. When the video hit social media again in 2017, it became a viral meme. According to the India Today, the woman said "what every common man feels deep down inside - that their government is corrupted - and this applies for people across the world". It was also parodied by actor Irrfan Khan.

== Pawri Ho Rai Hai ==
In February 2021, 19-year-old Islamabadian Dananeer Mubeen made a short video with her friends portraying a mockery of "burger people", which is Pakistani slang for those who try to emulate Western culture, saying, "Yeh hamari car hai, aur yeh hum hein aur yeh hamari pawri ho rai hai!" (This is our car, and these are us, and this is our party taking place!)

The video went viral on social media and started a meme trend by people and celebrities joining the bandwagon by making videos. The video also became viral in neighboring India after Yashraj Mukhate's composition, and in both the countries different hashtags #PawriHoRaiHai #PawriHoRahiHai #PawriHoriHai trended on Twitter with people, celebrities, brands and organizations posted following the trend.
