= Babylonokia =

Artwork

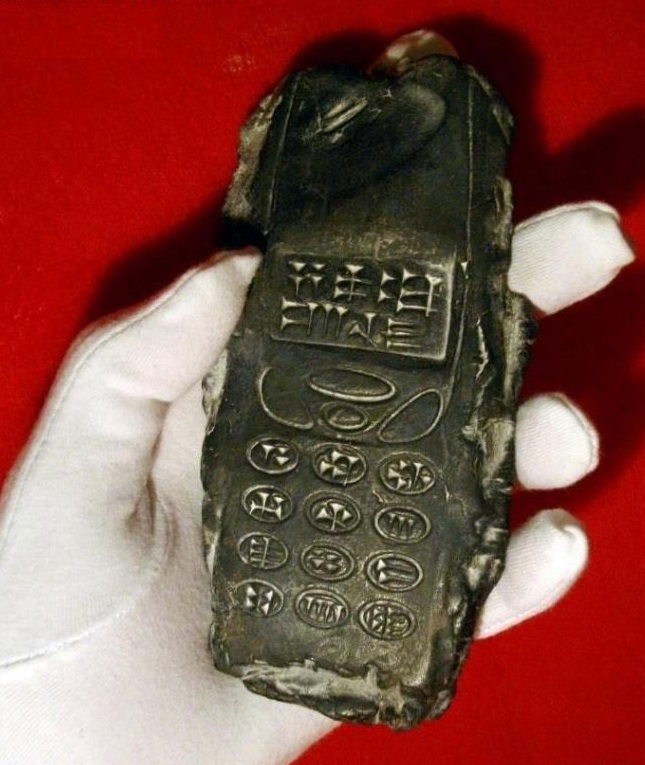
Babylonokia

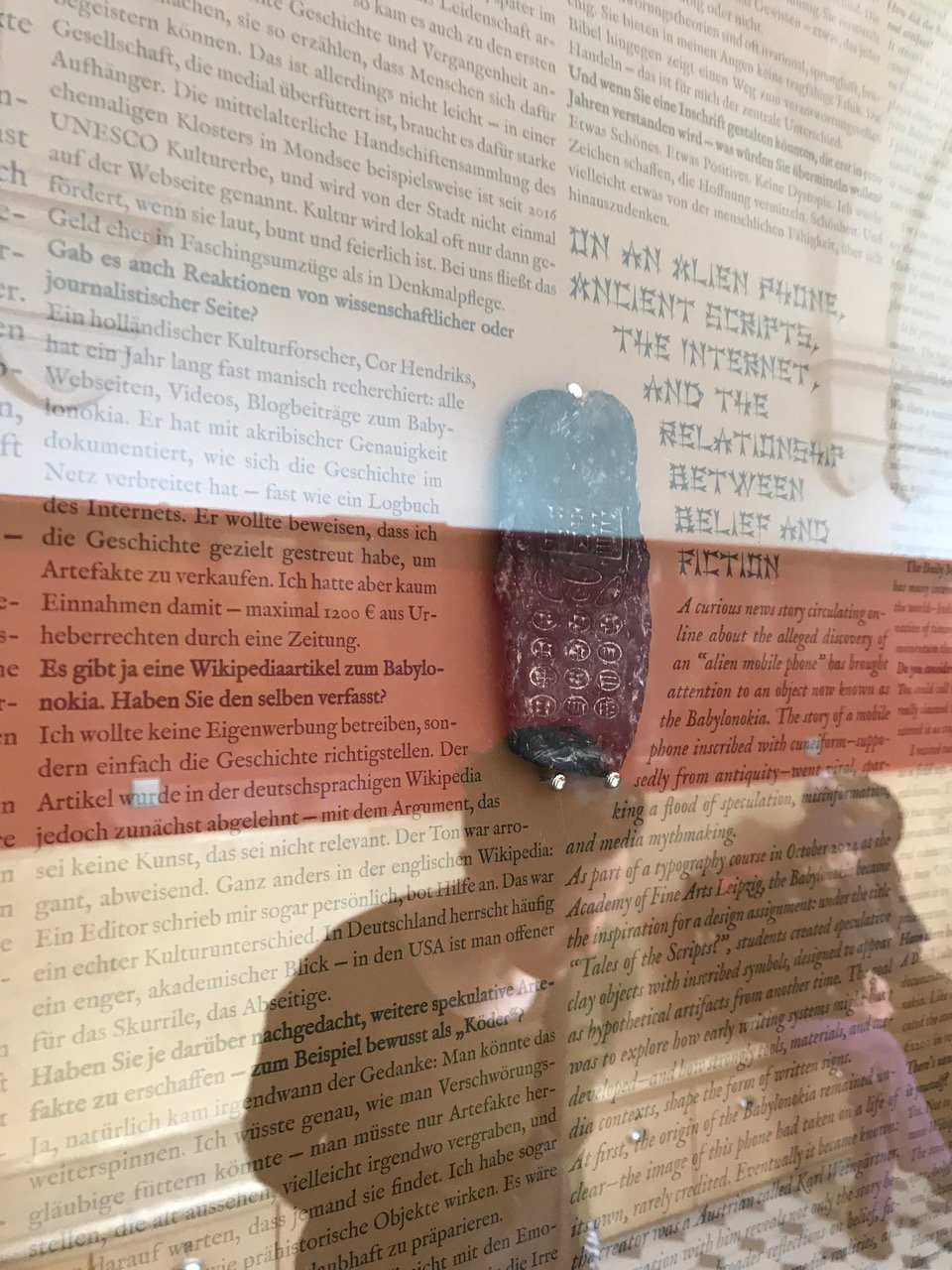
BabyloNokia on display at the Academy of Fine Arts Leipzig

Babylonokia (also Babylon-Nokia, Alien-Mobile, and Cuneiform Mobile Phone) is a 2012 artwork by Karl Weingärtner in the form of a clay tablet shaped like a mobile phone, its keys and screen showing cuneiform script.

Weingärtner created the work to represent the evolution of information transfer from the ancient world to the present. Fringe scientists and pseudoarchaeology proponents subsequently misrepresented a photograph of the artwork as showing an 800-year-old archaeological find; that story was popularised in a video on the YouTube channel Paranormal Crucible and led to the object being reported by some press sources as a mystery.

== Artwork ==
Weingärtner created the phone-styled clay tablet with cuneiform signs as a reaction to an exhibition at the Museum for Communication in Berlin titled From the Cuneiform to the SMS: Communication Once and Today, as well as the negative, global effects of information technology. Cuneiform signals the beginning of written records of information.

The fact that it is a clay copy of what appears to be an Ericsson S868 mobile phone, a model from the 1990s, had no meaning for the artist, who was using it as a metaphor for mobile devices in general.

The work of art is unique and is kept by the artist. It is available on request as a loan for museums and exhibitions. It is made from clay, weighs 91 grams (3¼ oz), and measures approximately 13.5 by 6.5 by 0.8 centimetres (5.31 by 2.56 by 0.31 in).

== Misrepresentation ==
Weingärtner posted a photo of the image on Facebook as part of a sale of his work, and a Facebook commenter coined the name "BabyloNokia". Three years later, the image was posted to the Conspiracy Club website with the headline "800-Year-Old Mobile Phone Found In Austria? Check This Out." The Express reposted Weingärtner's photo without attribution and claimed that the artifact had been dated to the 13th century BCE.

Speaking about the image's use by fringe websites and the press, Weingärtner said "The photo was used without my knowledge and without my consent. [...] It’s not what I wanted. I do not believe in UFOs and I do not believe in aliens."
