= Hou De Kharcha =

Internet meme

Hou de Kharcha (Marathi: होउ दे खर्च) is an internet meme in the Marathi language, originating in the state of Maharashtra, India. Its Facebook page and Google app appeared in 2013. The literal translation of Hou de kharcha is "let there be expenditure", analogous to the American English phrase "make it rain". The meme usually consists of an image of a person appearing triumphant, with a caption congratulating them on achieving petty materialistic milestones such as "Buying Shoes", "Light Diwali Crackers With", or "Buying an Enfield Bullet by Way of a Loan". The meme arose in mockery of the practice of Indian politicians erecting large numbers of hoardings (billboards) in order to announce minor or routine events.

== Background ==
Indian politicians in Maharashtra use hoardings for petty things like birthday wishes for other politicians of the same party, or holiday wishes. When the former revenue minister Narayan Rane celebrated his birthday in 2008, scores of hoardings were put up across the state. Similarly, a Bharatiya Janata Party legislator had 4,000 hoardings put up across the city following his election. Politicians like Raj Thackeray have asked his partymen to stop putting up these hoardings. In parts of India, hoardings with pictures of political activists and a message of birthdays, honor, steadfast support etc. are common sights. Recognising the humour potential in this practice, people created memes mocking the excessive congratulating of small events by adding captions to digital images, and shared these "Hou De Kharcha" memes via Facebook and WhatsApp

== Popularity ==
This meme became a viral trend among the Marathi-speaking crowd around the globe through social media. The meme's official Hou de Kharcha Facebook page has over 165,000 fans and receives 100+ image requests everyday as of December 2013.

== Other punchlines ==
Apart from the main "Hou De Kharcha" punchline there are other humorous punch line used in memes:

- "Ekach fight, vaataavaran tight"(Marathi: एकच फाइट वातावरण टाइट): "Only one fight, atmosphere tight"
- "Sodli ekach goli, khallas akkhi toli"(Marathi: सोडली एकच गोळी खल्लास अख्खी टोळी): "Shot one bullet, finished the whole gang"
- "Aali hukki, dili bukki"(Marathi: आली हुक्की दिली बुक्की): "Sudden change of mind, give fist fight"
- "Aali lahar, kela kahar"(Marathi: आली लहर केला कहर): "Incoming wave, made storm out of it"
- "Rajacha Rajpan kaalpan aajpan udyapan"(Marathi: राजाच राजपण कालपण आजपण उद्यापण: "King's rules yesterday, today and tomorrow"
- "Hou de tota baap aahe motha"(Marathi: होऊ दे तोटा बाप आहे मोठा): "There be loss, dad is big shot"
- "Baghtos kay raagaane? <action> vaaghaane" (Marathi: बघतोस काय रागाने? <action> वाघाने): "What are you seeing with rage? <action> is done by tiger"
- "Charcha tar honarach" (Marathi: चर्चा तर होणारच): "There sure will be discussion (on performance of a feat)"
- "Sarva mulincha daava aahe, <name> <honorary title> chhava aahe" (Marathi: सर्व मुलींचा दावा आहे, <name> <honorary title> छावा आहे): "All girls claim, <name> <honorary title> is a tiger cub (indicating that the person is a badass)"
