= Kung Fu Bear =

Internet meme

Kung Fu Bear is an Internet meme involving an Asian black bear who skillfully twirls, throws and catches a long staff.

Claude the bear is a resident of Asa Zoo in Hiroshima, Japan. When he first arrived at the zoo in 2002, zookeepers supplied him with long sticks to play with. Claude has become adept at manipulating them in a style reminiscent of a Kung Fu performance.

When videos of Claude's behavior were first published on the Internet in 2007, many viewers suspected they were a product of camera tricks or other fraud. Reporters for CNN, CBS and the Telegraph have confirmed that Claude's skills are genuine. As of June 2010, the videos have been viewed over two million times on YouTube, CNN.com, and other websites. (Some versions of the video were eventually taken down from YouTube, due to copyright-infringing use of Carl Douglas' song "Kung Fu Fighting"; its popularity is greater than its currently displayed viewer counts indicate.)
