= Sigma (disambiguation) =

Sigma (Σ or σ, word-final lowercase ς) is the 18th letter of the Greek alphabet.

Sigma may also refer to:

== Companies and organizations ==
- Sigma (analytics company), an American analytics company
- Sigma AB, a Swedish IT consultancy company
- Sigma Alimentos, multinational food processing and distribution company
- Sigma Corporation, a Japanese camera and lens manufacturer
- Sigma Designs, Inc., a US semiconductor manufacturer
- Sigma Guitars, a guitar manufacturing brand
- Sigma Healthcare, an Australian pharmaceutical company
- Sigma Motor Corporation, a defunct South African motor vehicle assembler and manufacturer
- Sigma Motors, a Pakistani assembler of Land Rovers
- Sigma Sigma Sigma (Tri-Sigma), an American women's sorority centered on education & scholarship
- Sigma Sport, a German manufacturer of electronic sports equipment
- SIGMA (Support for Improvement in Governance and Management), a joint initiative of the OECD and the European Union
- Sigma TV, a television channel in Cyprus
- Sigma (operations research), a company founded in the UK in 1961
- SIGMA (verification service), Nielsen Media Research's tracking system for videos
- Sigma-Aldrich, an American chemical company
- Telkomsigma or Sigma Cipta Caraka, an Indonesian IT company

== Films and television ==
- Sigma (film), a 2026 Indian film
- Ood Sigma, a fictional character from the Doctor Who series
- Space City Sigma, a 1980s Indian science fiction TV series
- Sigma, a fictional character from the anime Tweeny Witches
- Sigma Society, a fictional Mensa-type club, appearing in the third episode of Columbo sixth season
- Sigma, a fictional character from the Bungo Stray Dogs manga and anime series

== Mathematics ==
- Summation operator forming a series in mathematics Σ
- Standard deviation in statistics σ
- Divisor function in number theory σ
- Sigma-algebra (σ-algebra, σ-field) in set theory
- A busy beaver function in computability theory Σ
- $\Sigma^0_n$ or $\Sigma^1_n$, sets in the analytical hierarchy
- $\Sigma^P_i$, a set in the polynomial hierarchy
- Harish-Chandra's σ function
- Weierstrass sigma function
- Sigma additivity

== Music ==
- Sigma (album)
- Sigma (DJs), a British drum and bass duo
- Universal Sigma, a Japanese record label under Universal Music Japan
- Sigma Boy, a 2024 single by Betsy and Maria Yankovskaya

== Places ==
- Sigma, Capiz, a municipality in the Philippines
- Sigma, Lee County, Virginia, an unincorporated community in the United States
- Sığma, Sarayköy, a neighbourhood of the municipality and district of Sarayköy, Denizli Province, Turkey

== Products ==
- GM Sigma platform, an automobile platform
- Mitsubishi Sigma, a model name used for various automobiles produced by Mitsubishi
- Chrysler Sigma, a version of the Mitsubishi Galant sold in Australia
- Ferrari Sigma, also known as the Pininfarina Sigma, a Formula 1 show car
- Ford Sigma engine, a series of straight four engines
- SDS Sigma series of computers from Scientific Data Systems
- Sigma (sailplane), an experimental glider developed in Britain from 1966
- SIGMA 155, a 155mm self-propelled howitzer
- Six Sigma quality management program
- Smith & Wesson Sigma, a firearm

== Science ==
- σ, sigma bond in chemistry
- σ, sigma factor of RNA polymerase in biology
- σ, Stefan–Boltzmann constant of radiation in physics
- σ, stress (mechanics), the force per unit area applied by internal forces of a material
- σ, the electronic substituent constant for activation of substituted arenes in the Hammett equation
- σ, a measure of a material's electrical conductivity ability
- Cross section σ in physics
- Pauli matrices in quantum physics
- Sigma baryon in particle physics
- Sigma receptor, a neural receptor
- Surface charge density in classical electromagnetism
- Sigma, a Greek letter used in Bayer designations for naming stars, in astronomy. Notable examples include:
  - Sigma Canis Majoris
  - Sigma Draconis
  - Sigma Octantis
  - Sigma Orionis

== Sport ==
- Sigma FC, a Canadian soccer team
- SK Sigma Olomouc, a Czech association football team
- Histor–Sigma, a Belgian professional cycling team known as Sigma in 1986

== Video games ==
- Sigma (Mega Man X), the main antagonist of the Mega Man X series
- Sigma (Overwatch), a hero from Overwatch
- Ninja Gaiden Sigma, a video game
- Sigma, a character in the BioShock 2 video game universe
- Sigma Harmonics, a video game
- Sigma Klim, a major character and protagonist in the Zero Escape video game series
- Sigma, a team on the Dota 2 online video game

== Other ==
- Sigma (couch), used in ancient Roman banquets
- Sigma class corvette, a naval ship
- Sigma male, a slang term for masculine men

== See also ==
- Sygma (disambiguation)
- M–sigma relation
