= Alena Aurum =

Russian video blogger

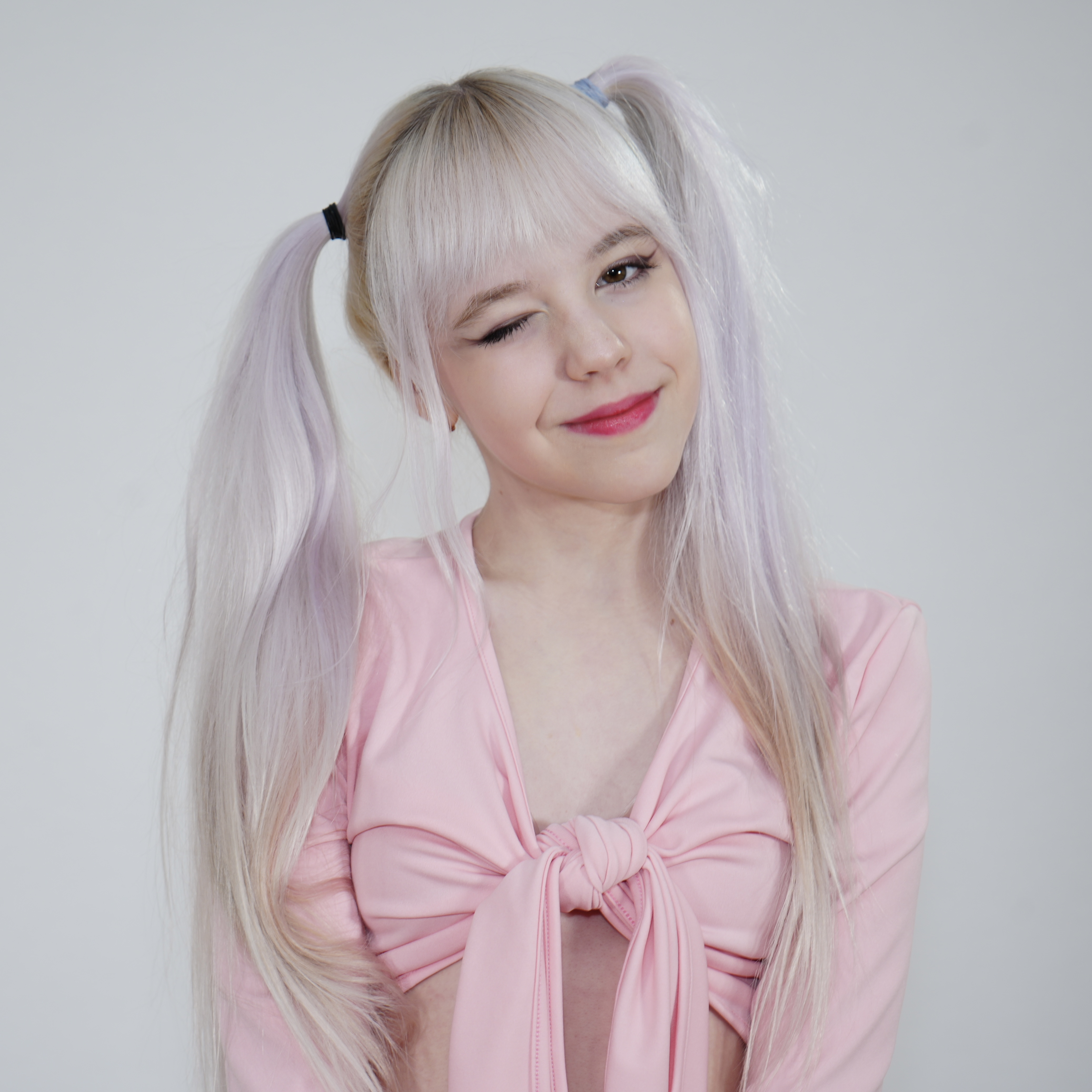

Background information
- Also known as: Alenka Star Be
- Born: Alyona Aleksandrovna Fedotova; 16 October 2009 (age 16); Odintsovo, Russia
- Occupations: Video blogger, social media influencer, singer, radio host
- Instrument: Vocals
- Years active: 2018–present
- Website: http://alyonaaurum.ru

Alеna Aurum (formerly Alenka Star Be; full name Alyona Aleksandrovna Fedotova; (Note: The Russian given name Aлёна is transliterated as both Alena and Alyona.) born 16 October 2009) is a Russian singer, radio host, and video blogger on the Likee social network. Starting in 2018, Aurum began publishing short videos on Likee on the topics of entertainment, sketch comedy, dance, and lip-sync content. In 2020, she entered the top ten of Likee's global rankings. As of 2021, Aurum is ranked fourth among the most popular bloggers on the social network in the Commonwealth of Independent States.

== Early life ==
Alyona Alexandrovna Fedotova was born on 16 October 2009 in the Russian city of Odintsovo. She later moved to a village near Zvenigorod, where she began creating and uploading videos to the video-sharing app Likee. Initially, Fedotova studied at a secondary school and took courses in choreography, singing, and drawing. As her videos grew in popularity, she switched to homeschooling so that she could focus on video-blogging and performing at concerts.

== Career ==
On May 22, 2018, Fedotova registered the account "@alenka_star_be" on Likee, and began publishing videos under the name Alenka Star Be. After two years of active blogging, she became one of the app's top ten most popular social media influencers globally. In 2021, she ranked fourth in popularity among all Likee bloggers within the Commonwealth of Independent States; at the time, her channel had over 22 million subscribers.

Fedotova began her singing career in 2018, when she performed Russian poet Anna Petryasheva's song "Swim, Dolphin!" on the vocal show "I Sing! Kids." In early 2020, she released her first official single, "Sweet Day," followed by her second single "We Dance" six months later. In 2021, Fedotova performed both songs at a Likee Party event held in Saint Petersburg, alongside several other famous video bloggers.

Fedotova's third release, "I Don't Write Anymore," was her first release to be listed on the music charts in Russia. The ballad's story of a desperate affair was criticized by Russian music critic Vadim Ponomarev, who believed the topic was too adult for a singer of Fedotova's age. Fedotova later directed and released a music video for "I Don't Write Anymore."

On 28 October 2022, Fedotova performed a collaboration with Russian singer Maria Iankovskaia and the Zu Rock Band called "MNE NRA." (Note: 'I like it'; stylized in all caps) Fedotova and Iankovskaia subsequently launched a joint talk show of the same name, airing weekly from 11 November 2022 to 2 June 2023 on Radio Kids FM. The show featured Victoria Solovyova, Nastya Kosh, Aminka Vitaminka, and other popular Russian video bloggers. On the day of the song's release, Fedotova made a guest appearance on the fourth episode of the third season of the program The Nastya and Vova Show on STS Kids. On 1 November 2022, a live version of "MNE NRA" was released. On 9 December of the same year, the singer released a new solo single, "Snowflake."

On 5 June 2023, Fedotova received nominations in three categories (Favorite of the Year, Best Song, and Collaboration of the Year) at the STS Kids' music awards ceremony, the "Super LIKE Show." On 8 September 2023, she released the song "Multistory" under a new stage name, Alena Aurum, and published the song's music video a week later.

== Reception ==
Russian music critic Vadim Ponomarev, who has reviewed several of Fedotova's songs on his online web blog Guruken, has called Fedotova a "phenomenon" on the children's internet. Ponomarev gave a positive review of the single "I Don't Write Anymore" in August 2021, noting Fedotova's unique vocal qualities.
