= Maybe Baby =

Maybe Baby may refer to:

== Film and television ==
- For Keeps (film) (working and international title Maybe Baby), a 1988 American film by John G. Avildsen
- Maybe Baby (film), a 2000 British film by Ben Elton
- "Maybe Baby" (The King of Queens), a 1999 television episode
- "Maybe Baby" (Quantum Leap), a 1990 television episode
- "Maybe Baby" (Roseanne), a 1994 television episode
- "Maybe Baby" (The Secret Life of the American Teenager), a 2009 television episode

== Music ==
- Maybe Baby (singer) (born 1995), Russian pop singer
- Maybe Baby (EP), by Blitzen Trapper, 2011
- "Maybe Baby" (song), by the Crickets (with Buddy Holly), 1957
