= Fake news (disambiguation) =

Fake news is a type of hoax or deliberate spread of misinformation published in traditional news media or via social media.

Fake news may also refer to:

== Arts and entertainment ==
- Fake News (album), a 2022 album by Pinguini Tattici Nucleari
- The Fake News Show, a British comedy panel show

== Other uses ==
- Fake news in the United States
  - Media bias in the United States
- Fake news website, deliberate publishing on websites of hoaxes, propaganda, and disinformation purporting to be real news
- Fake news websites in the United States
- List of fake news websites

== See also ==
- Advertorial, an advertisement in the form of editorial content
- Disinformation, intentionally false information intended to deceive the target audience
- Internet manipulation
- Lying press, a pejorative political term used largely by German political movements for the mass media
- Managing the news, acts intended to influence the presentation of information within the news media
- News propaganda, a type of propaganda covertly packaged as credible news, but without sufficient transparency concerning the source
- News satire, a type of parody presented in a format typical of mainstream journalism
- Spin (propaganda), a form of propaganda, achieved through providing a biased interpretation
- Video news release, a video segment made to look like a news report
