= Figma (disambiguation) =

Figma is a collaborative web-based vector editor and UX design tool.

Figma may also refer to:

- Figma (toy), a Japanese action figure line from Max Factory
- FIGMA, the Finnish Games and Multimedia Association

== See also ==
- Sigma, Eighteenth letter of the Greek alphabet
- Sigma (disambiguation), topics referred to by the same term
