= Bakovka railway station =

Railway station in Moscow Oblast, Russia

Bakovka Баковка
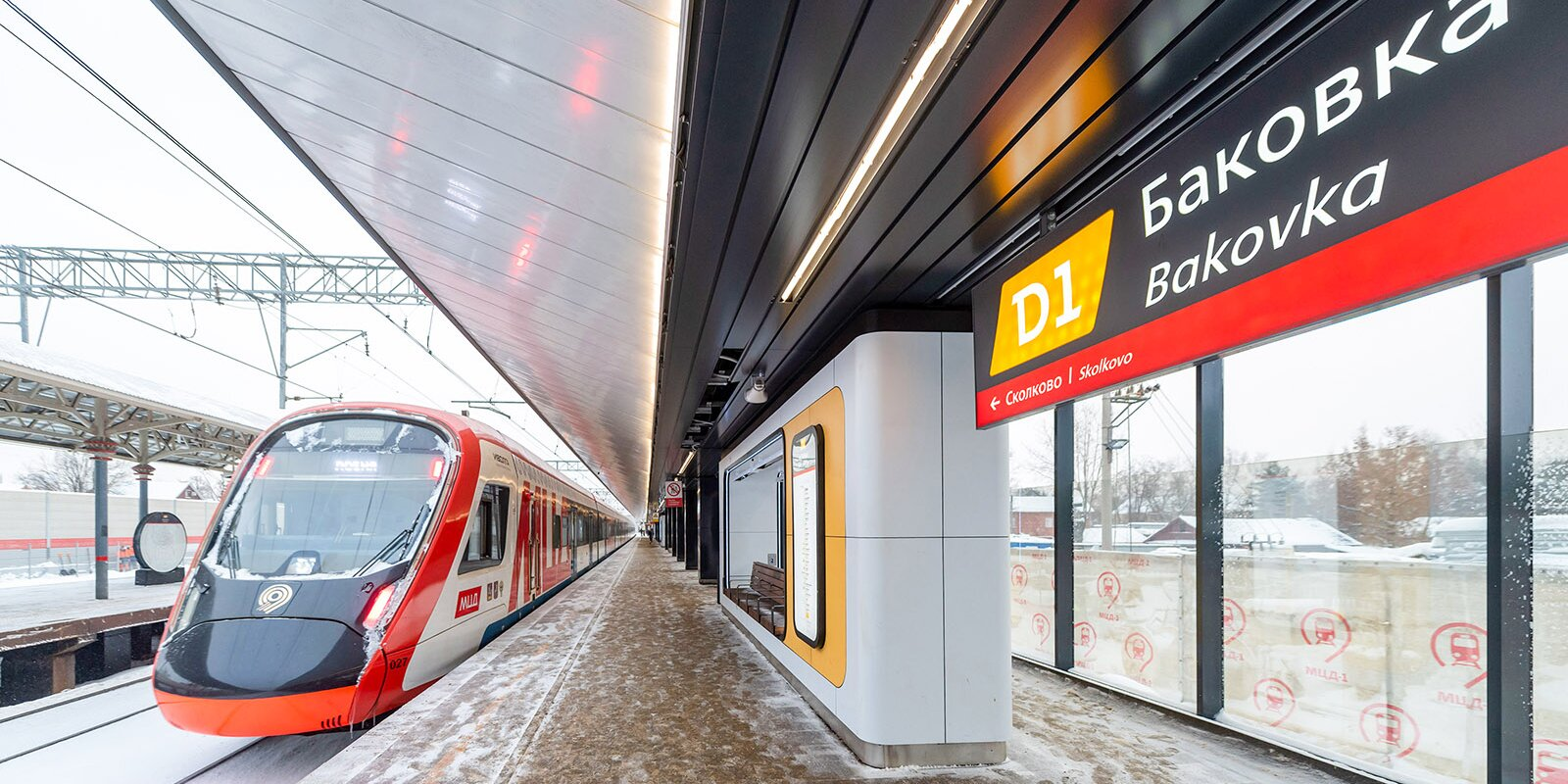

General information
- Location: Odintsovo, Moscow Oblast; Russia
- Coordinates: 55.6826°N 37.3147°E
- System: Moscow Railway platform
- Owner: Russian Railways
- Operator: Moscow Railway
- Platforms: 2 (Island platform)
- Tracks: 4

Construction
- Structure type: At-grade

History
- Opened: 1894

Services
Preceding station	Moscow Central Diameters	Following station
Odintsovo Terminus	Line D1	Skolkovo towards Lobnya
Preceding station	Russian Railways	Following station
Odintsovo towards Gagarin	Belorussky Suburban	Skolkovo towards Moscow Belorussky
Preceding station	Aeroexpress	Following station
Odintsovo Terminus	Odintsovo to Sheremetyevo Airport	Skolkovo towards Aeroport Sheremetyevo
Location

Bakovka is a railway station of Line D1 of the Moscow Central Diameters in Odintsovo, Moscow Oblast. It was opened in 1894 and rebuilt in 2021.

== Gallery ==
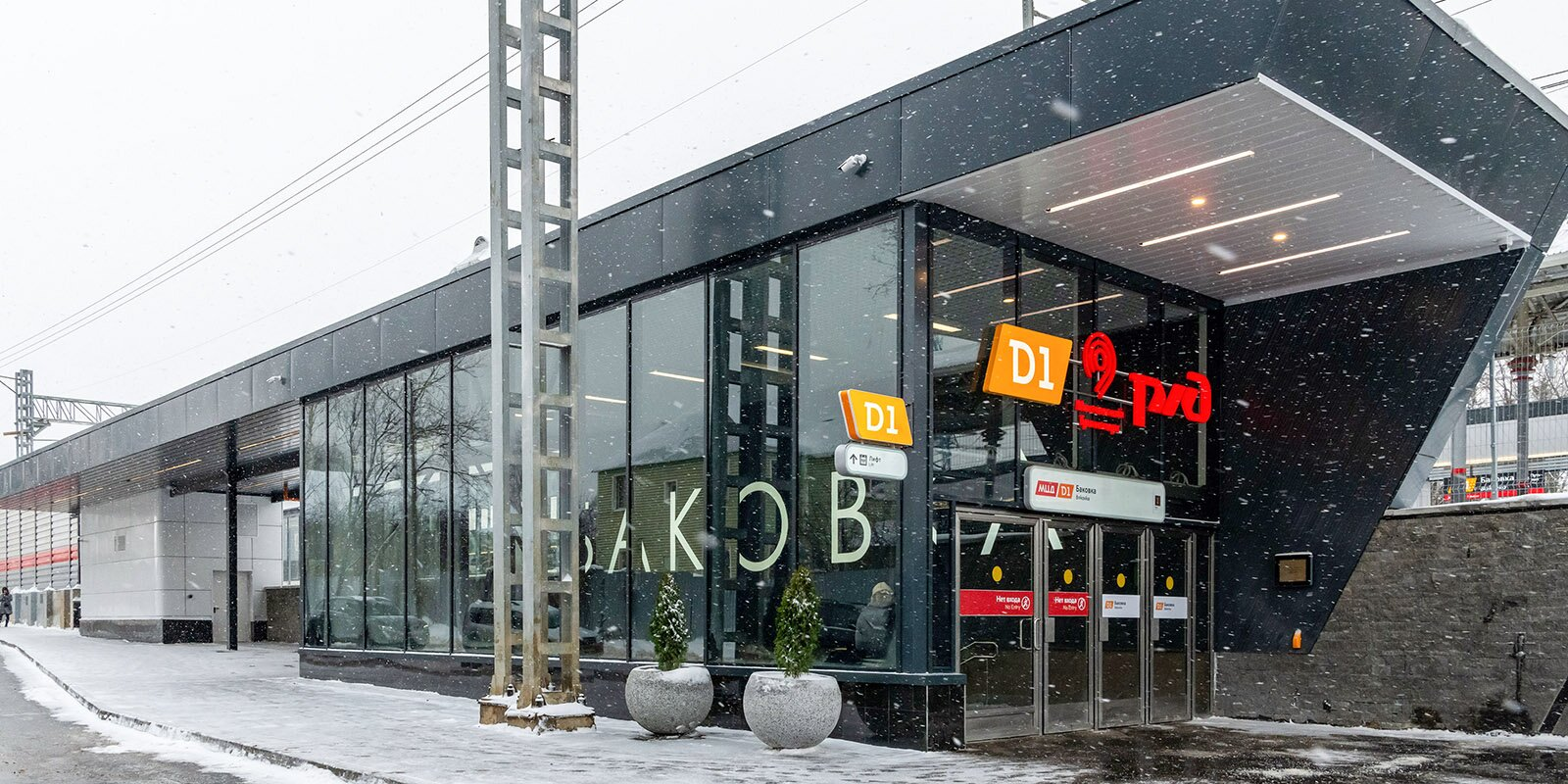
Bakovka railway station in January 2021

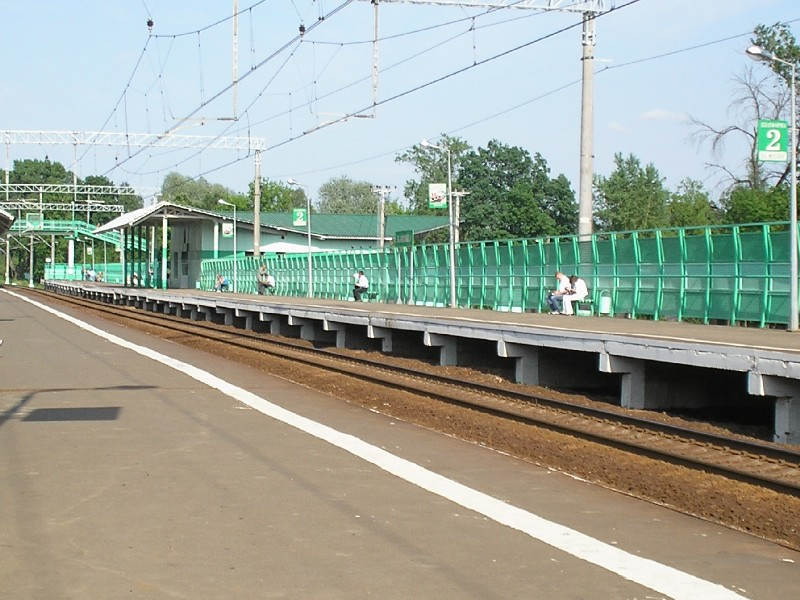
The station in 2007, before reconstruction.
