= Crazy Greapa =

South Korean YouTube channel

YouTube information
- Channel: CRAZYGREAPA
- Genre: Short form comedy
- Subscribers: 28.3 million
- Views: 28.4 billion
- Last updated: September 2025

Crazy Greapa (stylized in all caps; Korean: 크레이지 그레빠) is a South Korean YouTube channel run by a couple Im Jun-yeong (임준영; stage name Greapa; born 1986 or 1987) and Shin Chae-won (신채원; stage name Shin Cherri; 신체리; born 1996 or 1997). The channel primarily focuses on short-form comedy videos. It was reported in 2023 that, among South Korean YouTubers, they have some of the highest views on average per video.

The couple used to run a dance school together in Busan, and started a YouTube channel around 2019 to promote the school. After the outbreak of the COVID-19 pandemic, the school encountered financial difficulties and they switched to being full time YouTubers. At the time, their TikTok account had around 300,000 followers and their YouTube channel around 100,000. They moved to Daejeon, and then to Seoul around 2023. Their videos have various recurring characters, such as "Sigma Girl" and "Omega Boy" based on the alpha, beta, and sigma male tropes.
