= Sigma Boy =

2024 single by Betsy and Maria Iankovskaia

Single by Betsy and Maria Iankovskaia
- Language: Russian
- Released: 4 October 2024
- Genre: Dance-pop; Novelty
- Length: 2:14
- Songwriter: Mikhail Chertishchev

Music video
- "Sigma Boy" on YouTube

"Sigma Boy" (Russian: «Сигма Бой») is a song by Russian bloggers and singers Betsy and Maria Iankovskaia, released as a single by the record label Rhymes Music on 4 October 2024. It became viral on TikTok and charted on Spotify, YouTube, Shazam, Apple Music, and iTunes. On Spotify, it topped the Viral 50 Global chart. It is known to be a popular meme amongst Generation Alpha.

== Background and release ==
Betsy had been recording songs for several years. Notably, her "Simple Dimple Pop It Squish" («Симпл Димпл Поп Ит Сквиш») was popular in Asia. Maria Iankovskaia is a blogger and a regular host at STS Kids, a Russian children's TV channel. On 19 October 2024, Betsy and Maria received the STS Kids' SuperLikeShow award in the "Super Trend" category. They also performed their song "Sigma Boy" on stage during the award ceremony.

The song was written by Betsy's father, composer Mikhail Chertishchev, in collaboration with rock singer Mukka, most notable for the song "Girl with a Bob Haircut" («Девочка с каре»). According to Chertishchev, when writing songs, they come to him spontaneously and do not initially "have any meaning". He records them on a dictaphone and later evaluates their "virality".

The song's success is credited to TikTok's "word-of-mouth". Notably, German TikToker Streichbruder started a trend in which he would play the song at full volume in public transport.

== Reception ==
"Sigma Boy"
27-second sample of Sigma Boy

The song has been described by some as brain rot due to its lyrics being seen as "nonsensical" because of its use of the term sigma.

According to Betsy, the song's meaning is "the idea is that Masha and I are so cool, and the Sigma Boy is trying to win us over, and we are trying to win him over too". She has also explained that "the Sigma Boy is a very self-confident boy who doesn't need anyone. At the same time, all the girls fall in love with him."

Ukraine's Center for Countering Disinformation have condemned the song, describing it as a "weapon of Moscow's information warfare" and part of Russia's efforts to "cement its narratives and cultural influence". Foreign Ministry spokeswoman Maria Zakharova denounced the criticism of the song, calling such remarks "madness" and "clinical Russophobia".

Ultra-conservative Russian Orthodox movement Sorok Sorokov has accused its creators of sexualizing children and urged the Prosecutor General of Russia to investigate. Songwriter Chertishchev has dismissed the allegations.

== Charts ==
=== Weekly charts ===
Chart performance for "Sigma Boy"
Chart (2025)	Peak position
Austria (Ö3 Austria Top 40)	56
Czech Republic Singles Digital (ČNS IFPI)	30
Germany (GfK)	40
Israel (Mako Hitlist)	68
Russia Streaming (TopHit) (Note: The Russian Streaming chart was launched in late March 2025. Therefore, "Sigma Boy" did not have a full run on the chart.)	7
Slovakia Singles Digital (ČNS IFPI)	24
Sweden (Sverigetopplistan)	58
US Hot Dance/Pop Songs (Billboard)	7

=== Monthly charts ===
Monthly chart performance for "Sigma Boy"
Chart (2025)	Position
Russia Streaming (TopHit)	10

=== Year-end charts ===
Year-end chart performance for "Sigma Boy"
Chart (2025)	Position
Russia Streaming (TopHit)	19

=== Decade-end charts ===
20s Decade-end chart performance
Chart (2025–2026)	Position
Russia Streaming (TopHit)	29

== See also ==
- Alpha and beta male § Sigma male
