= Online streamer =

Social media poster who broadcasts live

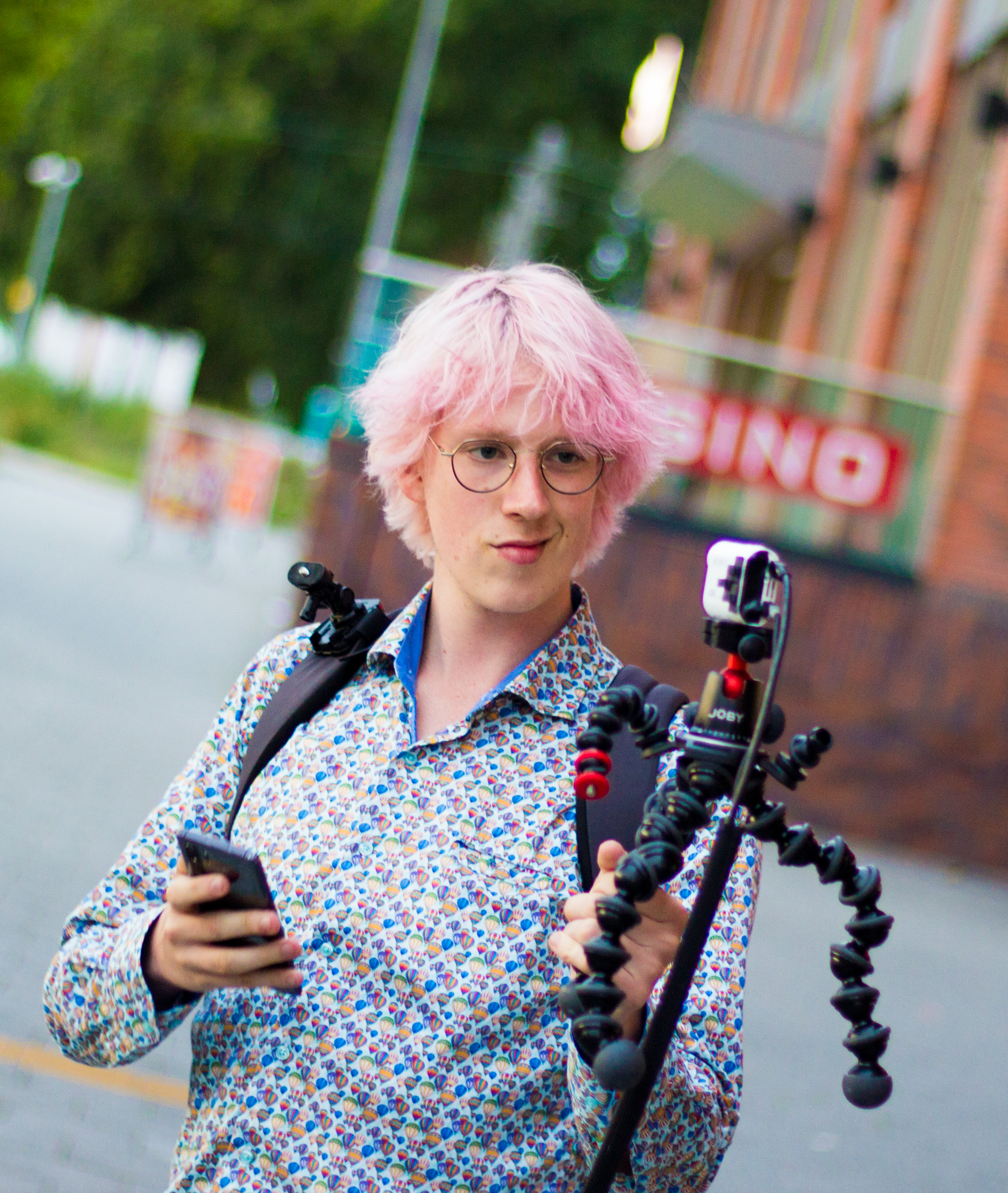
A Twitch streamer carrying recording gear

An online streamer or live streamer is a type of social media influencer who broadcasts themselves online through a live stream to an audience.

== History ==
Online streaming arose in the mid-to-late 2000s, originating on sites like YouTube where users could upload videos of themselves in the form of vlogs or Let's Plays. While not all content featured a live audience, users were still able to gain a sizable following and make a living from their content. Other sites like Twitch increased this popularity by offering innovations such as video clippings and pay-for-play. Due to the potential for high earnings from multiple income streams (e.g., ad revenue sharing, endorsements/partnerships, subscriptions), streaming has become a much-yearned-for career option.

== Genre ==
=== Video games ===
Let's Plays have been the most popular streamers by far since the beginning of live streaming. Today, the majority of streamers make their living from doing Let's Plays, live speedruns, and walkthroughs of video games. The biggest video game streamers are PewDiePie and Ninja, who make millions of dollars each year just from streaming.

=== IRL streams ===
While the majority of professional and part-time streamers play video games, many often do IRL (in real life) streams where they broadcast their daily life. At first, many streaming sites prohibited non-gaming live streams as they thought it would harm the quality of the content on their sites but the demand for non-gaming content grew. Topics include answering questions in front of a computer, streaming from their phone while walking outside, or even doing tutorials.

=== Virtual avatar ===
Virtual avatars, commonly known as VTubers, are a branch of streaming in which virtual avatars, occasionally paired with voice changers, are used instead of the streamer's face. There are multiple companies focused on the promotion, support and merchandising of VTuber talent, including Nijisanji and Hololive Production. In 2020, there were more than 10,000 active VTubers.

=== Pornographic streaming ===
Pornographic streams are a way to directly communicate with porn stars. Camgirls and camboys broadcast while nude or performing sexual acts often on demand from viewers. Sites like Plexstorm have created a niche by streaming video gamers performing or showing sexual content including pornographic games.

=== Trash streaming ===
A controversial form of live broadcasting where the host engages in shocking, dangerous, or humiliating activities, often to drive viewer donations. Popular primarily in Russia, Ukraine, and Poland, this format has also been observed in Finland and is associated with sensationalist content meant to provoke or entertain through extreme behavior.

=== Marathon/lifestream streaming ===
Some streamers broadcast nearly all aspects of daily life for prolonged periods. For example, a Twitch streamer known only as "Emily" streamed continuously for over 1,100 days, sharing her routines, meals, and personal moments - highlighting the emotional toll and blurred boundaries of online performance culture.

== By nations ==
=== South Korea ===
In South Korea, a streamer is called a "broadcast jockey". Broadcast jockeys have become popular over the years in Korea thanks in part to many of them being more relatable to viewers than some celebrities and becoming famous enough to appear on TV shows. While it is common for broadcast jockeys to become national stars, there has been a recent rise in the number of famous Korean idols and celebrities becoming broadcast jockeys either as a way to supplement their career or full-time as they make more money streaming than they would acting or singing. The number of famous stars becoming full-time broadcast jockeys has outpaced the number of part-timers as many prefer freedom over professional offers. Politicians have streaming channels. Korean sites include AfreecaTV, Naver TV, and KakaoTV in addition to worldwide streaming sites like Twitch, YouTube, and Bigo Live.

Mukbang, the live-streaming of eating a meal, originated in South Korea.

=== China ===
China has become the largest marketplace for live streaming. A large number of streamers make $10,000–$100,000 a month without having to be a big name on the Internet. This is due to the large population and the ubiquity of smartphones, where many Chinese citizens prefer to consume their entertainment. The live streaming market grew 180% in 2016 and has grown even more since then. Chinese streaming sites may be restricted to Chinese content and audiences due to the strict Internet rules in the country and the difficulty of cooperating with the Chinese Communist Party. Many Chinese streamers average 100,000 viewers per stream and earn $29,000 per month just by partnering with an agency.

== See also ==
- Streaming media
- YouTuber
