= Infoganda =

Infoganda is a term describing dramatic or literary work that contains both elements of an infomercial and propaganda. The term has been sporadically used in both the popular media and in blogs since 2001, and in talk shows since 2004.

== Definition ==
Infoganda is "a form of propaganda in which the message is delivered in a format that imitates an infomercial."

An infomercial is a work of commercial speech (typically a television advertisement) whose purpose is to advertise a commercial endeavor.

The combination of an infomercial and propaganda is an advertisement or show that pretends to be neutral (typically a news source) that has a real agenda of promoting the biased viewpoint of a large organization, typically a religious or government entity.

== History ==
The term "infoganda" dates to the early 2000s. "The origin," according to a contemporary source, was "Comedy Central, where it was used in a joke about media. Its refinement as an actual broadcast technique, unfortunately, gets credited to local television news."

Frank Rich, writing in The New York Times, said "these days in our 24/7 information miasma, real journalism and its evil twin merge into a mind-bending mutant that would defy a polygraph's ability to sort out the lies from the truth." It was explained to a large audience by Rob Corddry on The Daily Show with Jon Stewart on March 17, 2004. The Daily Show use of the word infoganda was in reference to a U.S. government video released in early March 2004 to many local television stations. The video featured a short report in local television news format that provided information about recent revisions to prescription drug coverage provided by Medicare.

Infoganda started with the George W. Bush administration and "escalated" from 2004 through 2013.

== See also ==
- Advocacy journalism
- News propaganda
- Video news release
