= Maria Iankovskaia =

Russian singer, blogger, actress (born 2012)

Maria Iankovskaia Мария Янковская
- Also known as: Masha
- Born: Maria Iankovskaia; 21 September 2012 (age 13); Moscow, Russia
- Genres: Pop
- Occupations: Singer, model
- Years active: 2022–present
- Label: Rhymes Music

Maria Iankovskaia (alternate spellings: Maria Yankovskaya, Masha Yankovskaya, Masha Iankovskaia; born 21 September 2012) is a Russian singer, blogger, and actress. She is a regular host on the STS Kids television channel.

== Early age, education, and career ==
Iankovskaia was born on 21 September 2012 in Moscow. Her father is a businessman, and mother is a producer at STS Kids.

She studied piano and vocals at the Glière Music School. She has a band called ZU Rock Band. She also performs solo, as well as in a duo with her older brother Georgy.

In 2024, she recorded a duet with Russian singer Betsy, "Sigma Boy."

In 2025, she was nominated for the Forbes 30 Under 30 list.

== Discography ==
With Betsy, as Masha Yankovskaya

Title	Year	Peak chart positions						
Title	Year	US Dance	RU Str.	AUT	GER	SWE	CZ	SK
"Sigma Boy"	2024	7	16	56	40	58	30	24
