= Advocacy journalism =

Genre of journalism that adopts a non-objective viewpoint

Advocacy journalism is a genre of journalism that adopts a non-objective viewpoint, usually for some social or political purpose.

Some advocacy journalists reject the idea that the traditional ideal of objectivity is possible or practical, in part due to the perceived influence of corporate sponsors in advertising. Proponents of advocacy journalism feel that the public interest is better served by a diversity of media outlets with varying points of view, or that advocacy journalism serves a similar role to that of muckraking.

== Perspectives from advocacy journalists ==
In an April 2000 address to the Canadian Association of Journalists, Sue Careless gave the following commentary and advice to advocacy journalists, which seeks to establish a common view of what journalistic standards the genre should follow.

- Acknowledge your perspective up front.
- Be truthful, accurate, and credible. Do not spread propaganda, do not take quotes or facts out of context, "don't fabricate or falsify", and "don't judge or suppress vital facts or present half-truths"
- Do not give your opponents equal time, but do not ignore them, either.
- Explore arguments that challenge your perspective, and report embarrassing facts that support the opposition. Ask critical questions of people who agree with you.
- Avoid slogans, ranting, and polemics. Instead, "articulate complex issues clearly and carefully."
- Be fair and thorough.
- Make use of neutral sources to establish facts.

Sue Careless also criticized the mainstream media for unbalanced and politically biased coverage, for economic conflicts of interest, and for neglecting certain public causes. She said that alternative publications have advantages in independence, focus, and access, which make them more effective public-interest advocates than the mainstream media.

== History ==
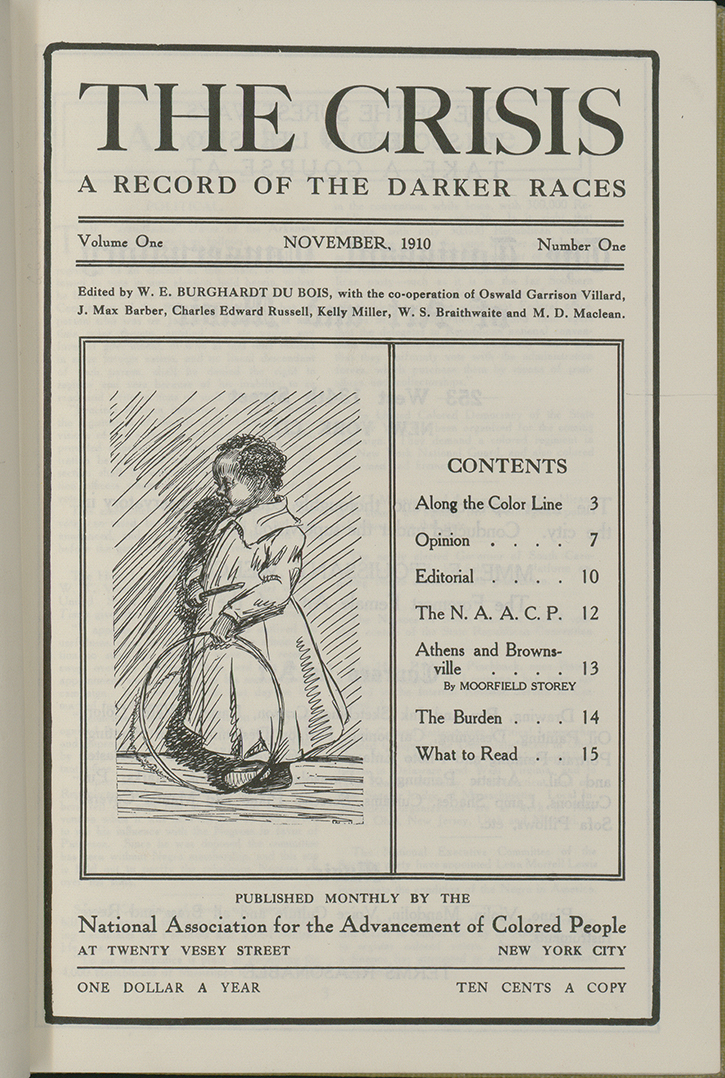
An image of The Crisis publication, an example of alternative and advocacy media

=== United States ===
19th century American newspapers were often partisan, publishing content that conveyed the opinions of journalists and editors alike. These papers were often used to promote political ideologies and were partisan to certain parties or groups.

The Crisis, the official magazine of the NAACP, was founded in 1910. It described itself as inheriting the tradition of advocacy journalism from Freedom's Journal, which began in 1827 as "the first African-American owned and operated newspaper published in the United States".

The Suffragist newspaper, founded in 1913 by the Congressional Union for Woman Suffrage, promoted the agenda of the National Woman's Party and was considered the only female political newspaper at the time.

Muckrakers are often claimed as the professional ancestors of modern advocacy journalists; for example: Ida M. Tarbell, Ida B. Wells, Nellie Bly, Lincoln Steffens, Upton Sinclair, George Seldes, and I.F. Stone.

20th and 21st century advocacy journalists include:

- Oprah Winfrey, who used her talk show to give visibility to causes, groups, and people
- Non-governmental organizations such as the American Civil Liberties Union, Greenpeace, Human Rights Watch, and UNAIDS
- Trade journal reporters highlighting issues like the environment, safety, social responsibility, and diversity
- Environmental journalism outlets like Inside Climate News and Yale Environment 360
- U.S. media outlets on the political left include Mother Jones, Jacobin, The Nation, and Pacifica Radio
- U.S. media outlets on the political right include Fox News, National Review, and the Weekly Standard

== Objectivity ==
Advocacy journalists may reject the principle of objectivity in their work for several different reasons.

Studies have shown that despite efforts to remain completely impartial, journalism is unable to escape some degree of implicit bias, whether political, personal, or metaphysical, whether intentional or subconscious. This does not necessarily indicate an outright rejection of the existence of an objective reality, but rather recognition of the inability to report on it in a value-free fashion and the controversial nature of objectivity in journalism. Many journalists and scholars accept the philosophical idea of pure "objectivity" as being impossible to achieve, but still strive to minimize bias in their work. It is also argued that as objectivity is an impossible standard to satisfy, all types of journalism have some degree of advocacy, whether intentional or not.

In recent years, some journalists have used new terminology to describe hybrid models that combine reporting with explicit normative commitments. The term “Journoist” has been used to describe an “evidence-first” approach that acknowledges perspective while emphasizing factual verification and public accountability. As of early 2026, the term has primarily appeared in self-published materials and professional profiles and has not been widely adopted in mainstream journalism scholarship.

== See also ==
- Appeal to emotion
- Environmental journalism
- Freedom of the press
- Infoganda
- Journalism ethics and standards
- Journalistic interventionism
- Muckraker
- News propaganda
- Opinion journalism
- Sensationalism
