= Skolkovo railway station =

Railway station in Moscow Oblast, Russia

Skolkovo Сколково
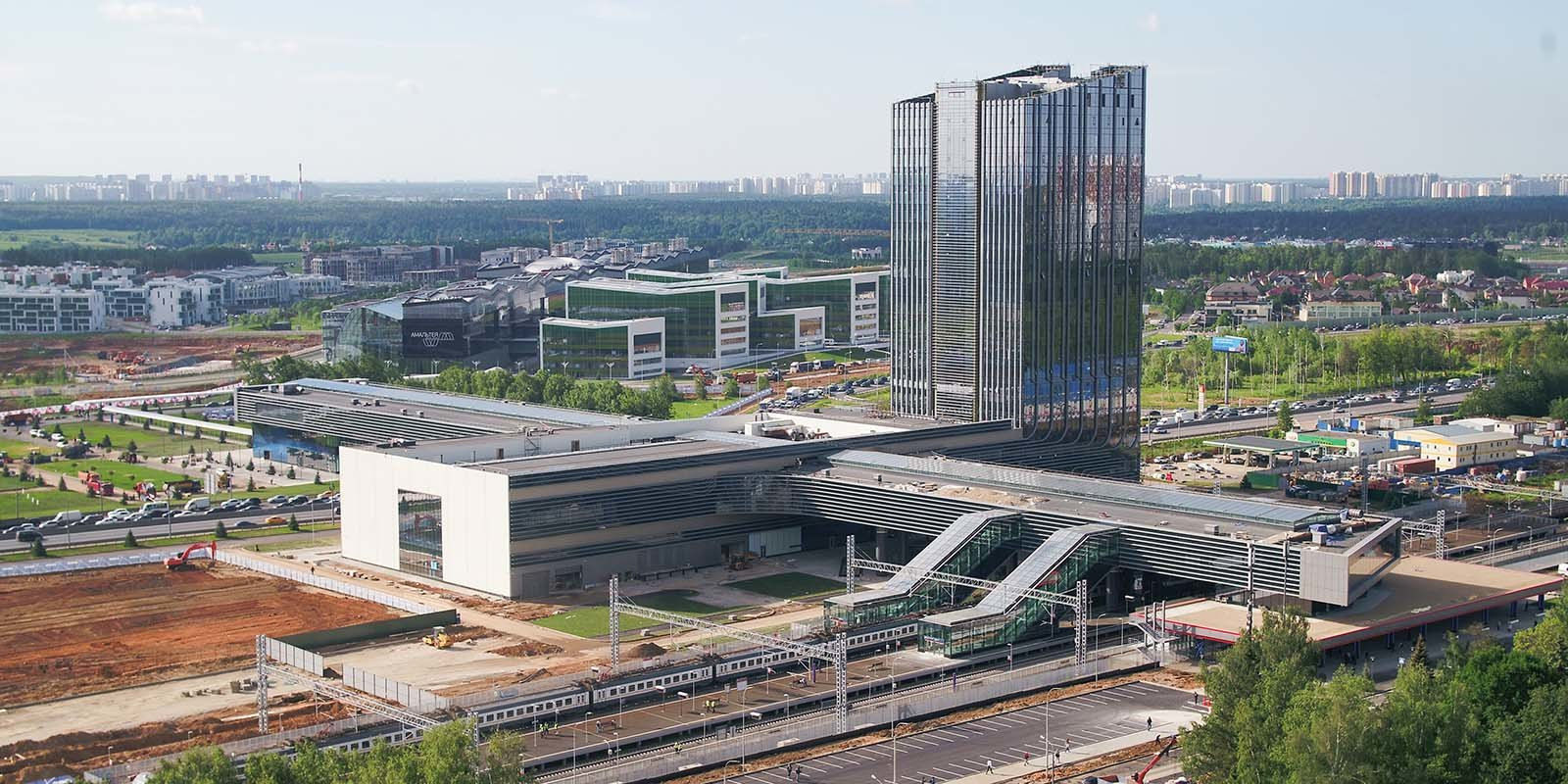

General information
- Location: Trokhgornaya Ulitsa, 12а, Trekhgorka; Moscow Oblast; Russia
- Coordinates: 55.700297°N 37.342827°E
- System: Moscow Railway platform
- Owner: Russian Railways
- Operator: Moscow Railway
- Platforms: 1 (Island platform)
- Tracks: 4

Construction
- Structure type: At-grade
- Parking: Yes
- Accessible: Yes

History
- Opened: May 27, 2019

Services
Preceding station	Moscow Central Diameters	Following station
Bakovka towards Odintsovo	Line D1	Nemchinovka towards Lobnya
Preceding station	Russian Railways	Following station
Bakovka towards Gagarin	Belorussky Suburban	Nemchinovka towards Moscow Belorussky
Preceding station	Aeroexpress	Following station
Bakovka towards Odintsovo	Odintsovo to Sheremetyevo Airport	Nemchinovka towards Aeroport Sheremetyevo
Location

Skolkovo is a railway station of Line D1 of the Moscow Central Diameters and the Belorussky suburban railway line in Moscow Oblast. It was opened on 27 May 2019.

== Gallery ==
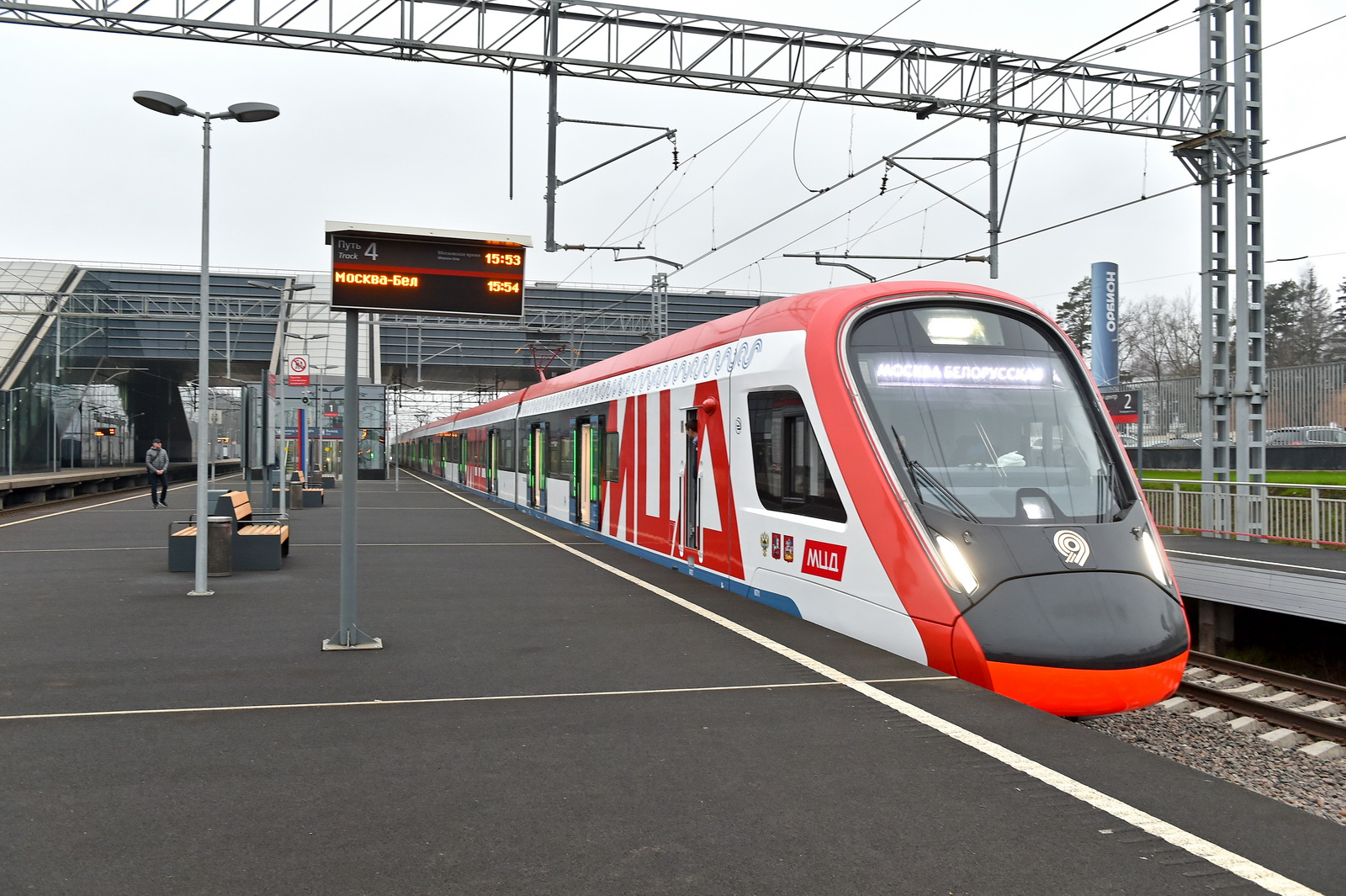

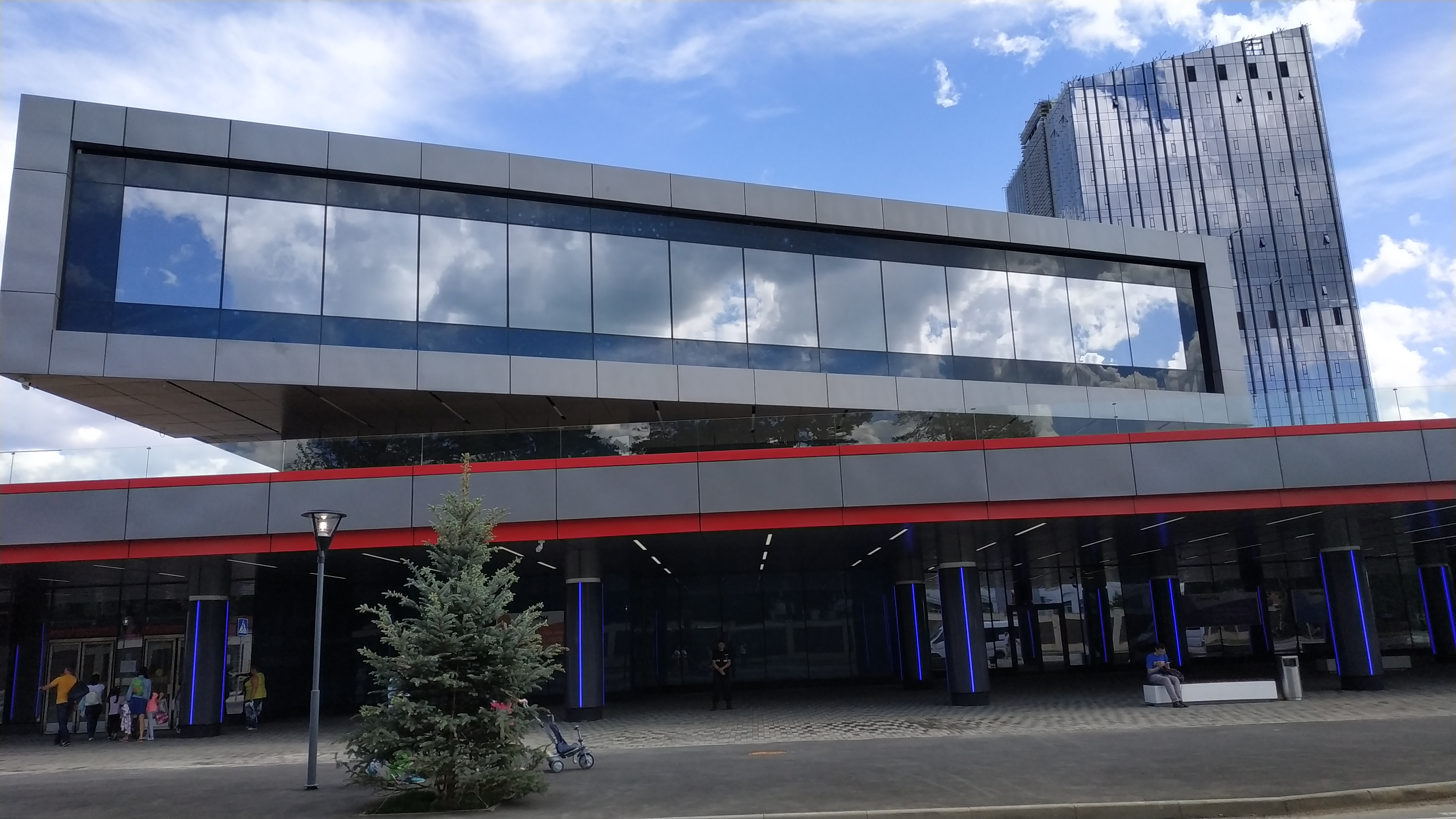

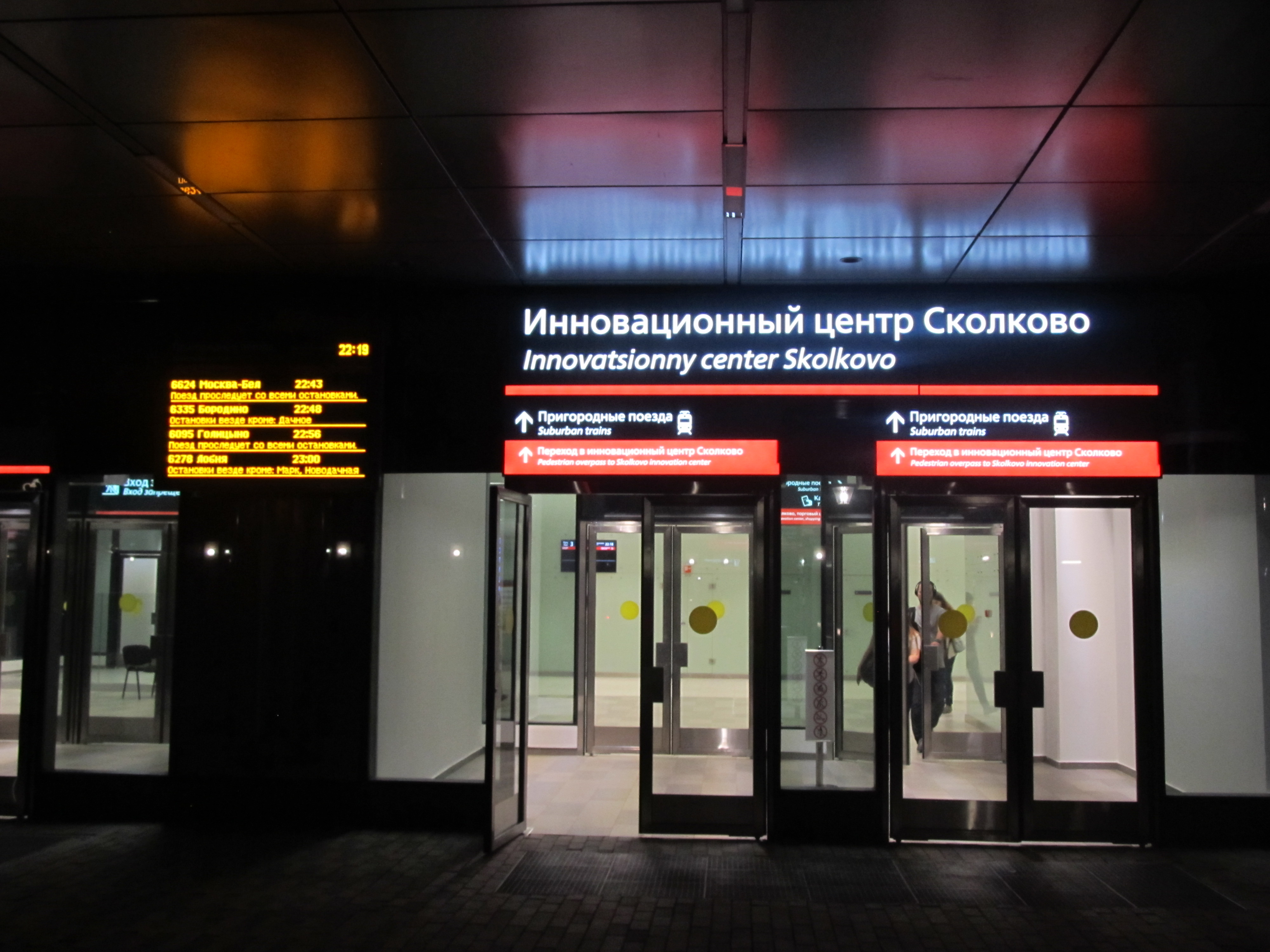

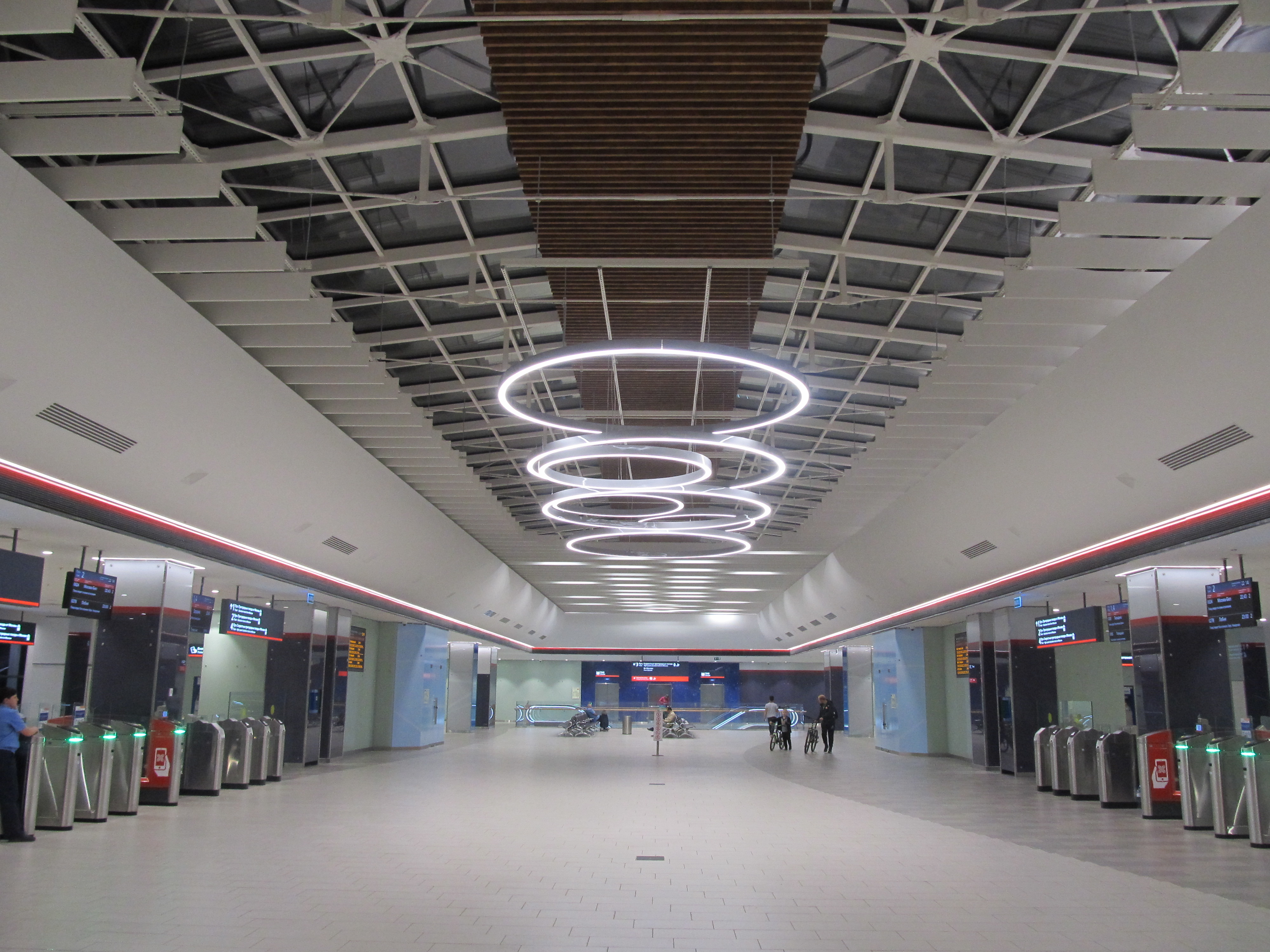
