= Odintsovo =

City in Moscow Oblast, Russia

Odintsovo Одинцово
- City
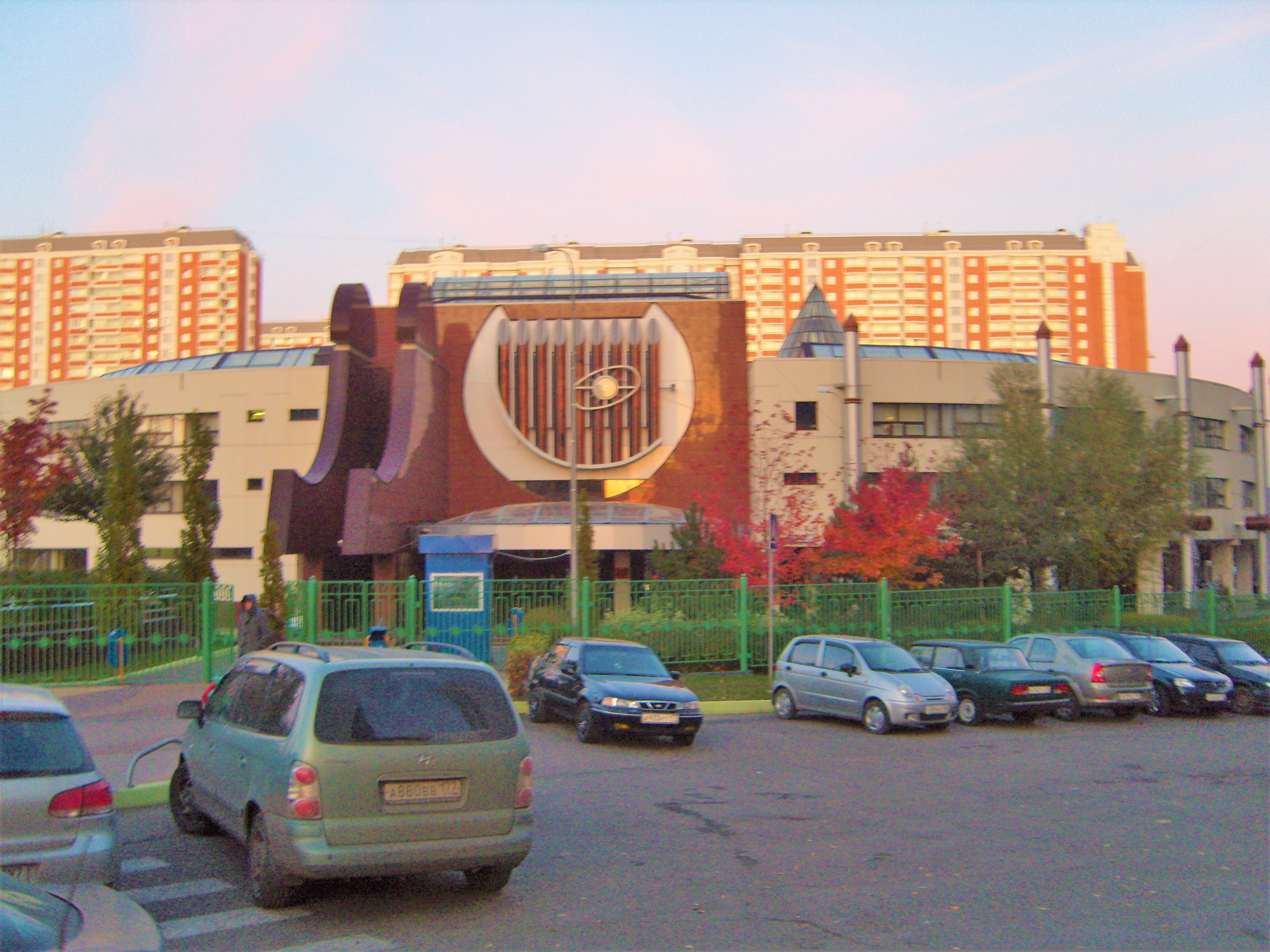

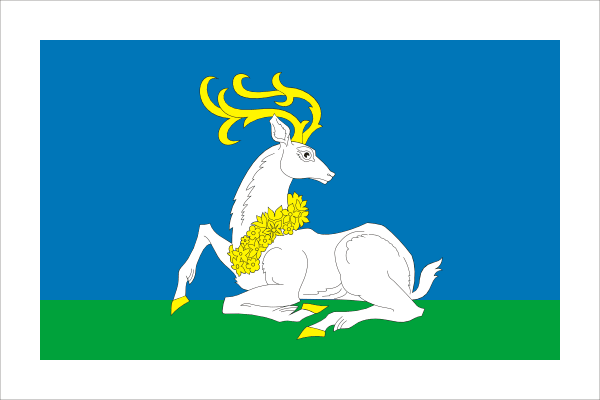
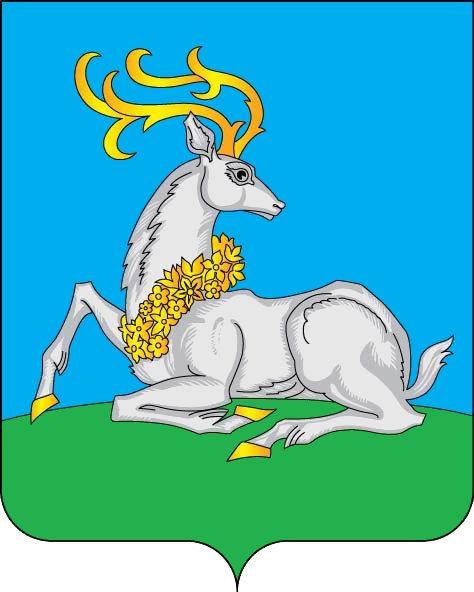
- Flag Coat of arms
- Interactive map of Odintsovo
- Location of Odintsovo Odintsovo (Moscow Oblast)
- Coordinates: 55°40′N 37°16′E
- Country: Russia
- Federal subject: Moscow Oblast
- Administrative district: Odintsovsky District
- CitySelsoviet: Odintsovo
- Founded: late 14th century
- City status since: 1957

Government
  - Head: Ivanov Andrei

Area
  - Total: 19.6 km^{2} (7.6 sq mi)
- Elevation: 190 m (620 ft)

Population (2010 Census)
  - Total: 138,930
  - Estimate (2025): 189,797 (+36.6%)
  - Rank: 122nd in 2010
  - Density: 7,090/km^{2} (18,400/sq mi)

Administrative status
  - Capital of: Odintsovsky District, City of Odintsovo

Municipal status
  - Municipal district: Odintsovsky Municipal District
  - Urban settlement: Odintsovo Urban Settlement
  - Capital of: Odintsovsky Municipal District, Odintsovo Urban Settlement
- Time zone: UTC+3 (MSK)
- Postal codes: 143000–143003, 143005–143007, 143009–143011, 143015–143019, 143027, 994010
- OKTMO ID: 46755000001
- Website: odintsovo-gorod.ru

Odintsovo (Russian: Одинцово, IPA: [ɐdʲɪnˈtsovə]) is a city and the administrative center of Odintsovsky District in Moscow Oblast, Russia. Western suburb of Moscow. Population: 180,530 (2021 census); 138,930 (2010 census); 134,844 (2002 census); 125,149 (1989 Soviet census).

Historical population
Year	Pop.	±%
1926	3,000	—
1939	12,548	+318.3%
1959	20,337	+62.1%
1970	67,354	+231.2%
1979	101,365	+50.5%
1989	125,149	+23.5%
2002	134,844	+7.7%
2010	138,930	+3.0%
2021	180,530	+29.9%
Source: Census data

== History ==
The village of Odintsovo was established in the late 14th century by a noble known as Andrey Odinets (whose real name was Andrey Domotkanov). For his great service to Dmitry Donskoy Odinets was granted land to the southwest of Moscow. Town status was granted to Odintsovo in 1957.

== Administrative and municipal status ==
Within the framework of administrative divisions, Odintsovo serves as the administrative center of Odintsovsky District. As an administrative division, it is, together with nineteen rural localities, incorporated within Odintsovsky District as the City of Odintsovo. As a municipal division, the City of Odintsovo is incorporated within Odintsovsky Municipal District as Odintsovo Urban Settlement.

== Coat of arms ==
The coat of arms of Odintsovo shows a white deer, representing cleanliness and purity. The deer lies facing the west, although gazes to the east.

== Sports ==
Odintsovo volleyball clubs Iskra (men) and Zarechie Odintsovo (women) were both champions of Russia in the past and are still performing successfully. Zarechie Odintsovo won in the final in April 2008 against Dinamo Moscow to become champions of Russia. Many male and female players in Russian national volleyball teams either grew up, or played/trained in Odintsovo.

"The Ice Palace", or the Odintsovo ice skating and hockey ring, was named to have "the best ice ever played on" by North American and former Soviet ice hockey veterans during the Stanley Cup visit in 2004.

== Religion ==
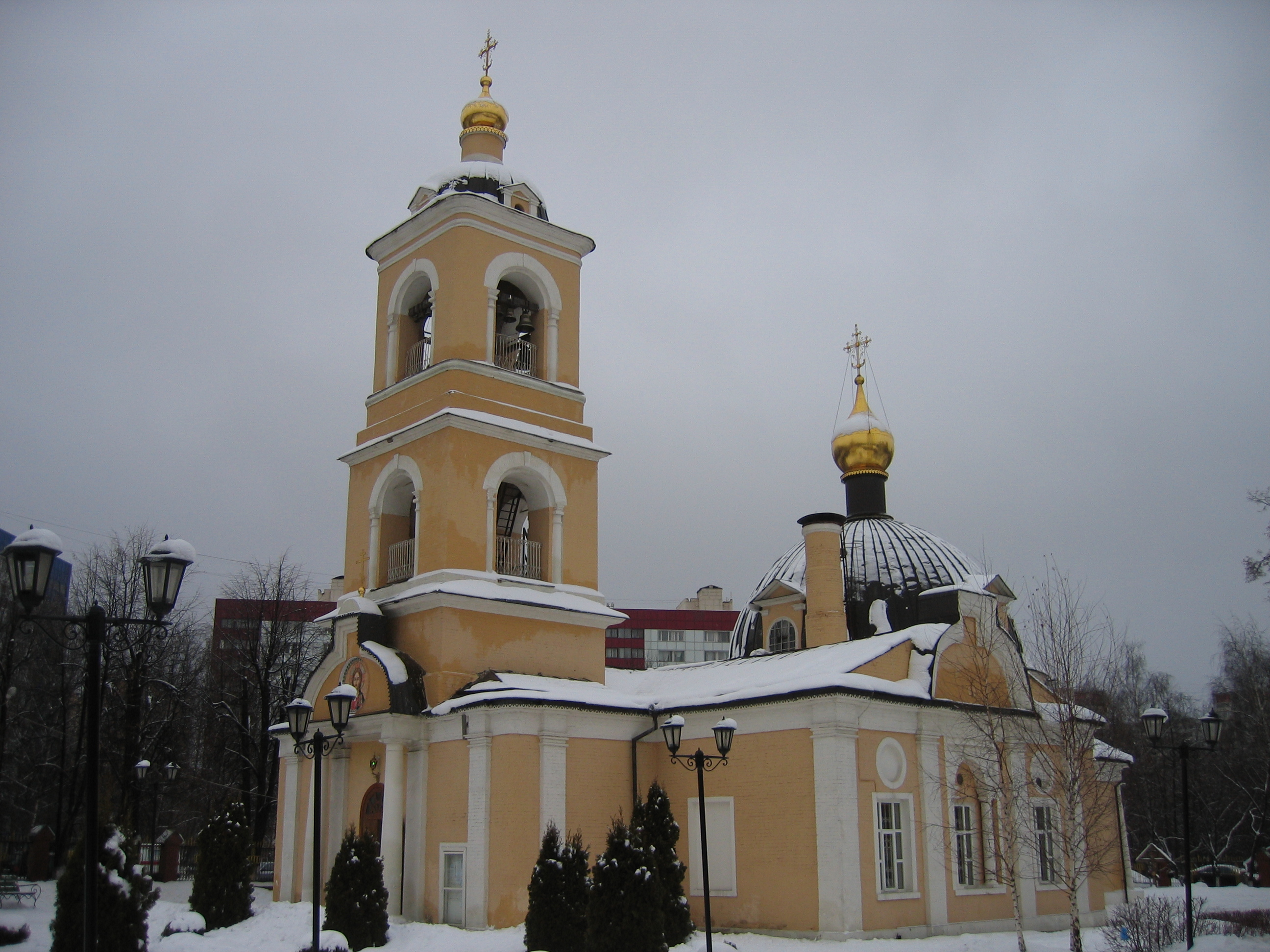
Church of Grebnevskaya

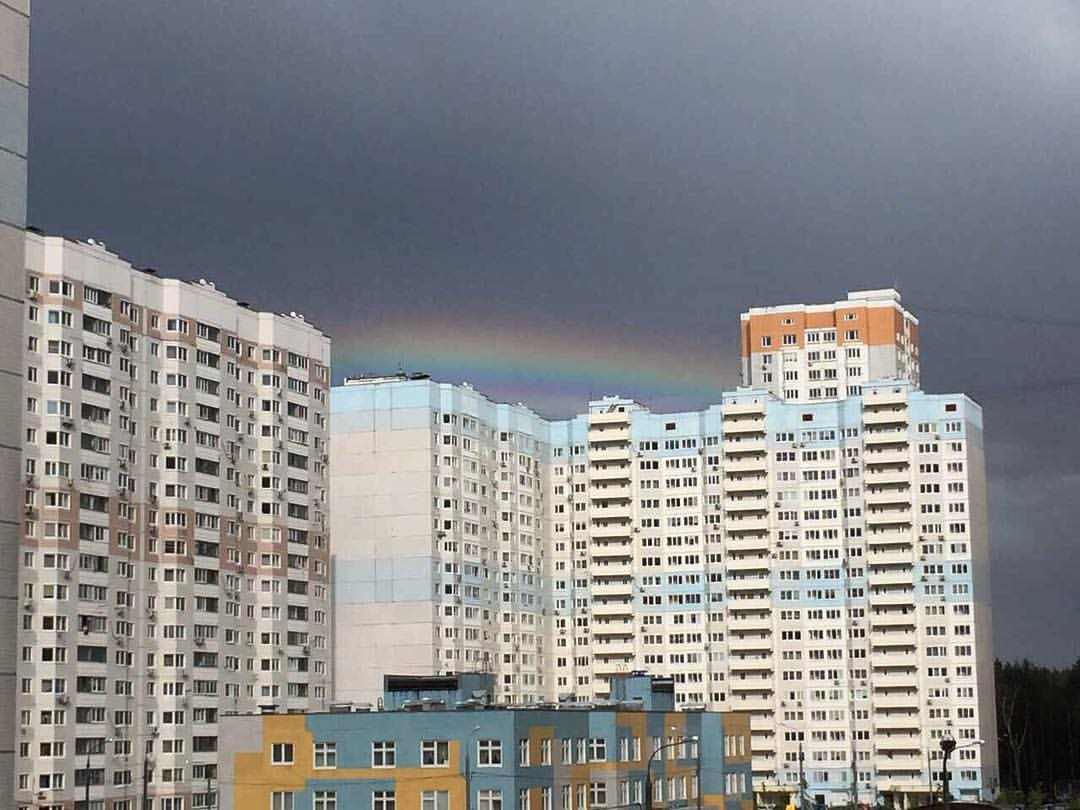
Residential complex in Odintsovo

Odintsovo is home to the Church of Grebnevskaya, Icon of the Mother of God, which was built in 1802.

== Notable people ==
- Alеna Aurum (born 2009), singer, radio host, and video blogger on the Likee social network
- Olga Budina (born 1975), theater and film actress
- Ivan Dubasov (1897–1988), artist active in the Soviet Union
- Konstantin Krizhevsky (1926-2000), footballer
- Larisa Lazutina (born 1965), Olympic, Russian, and World Cross-country skiing champion

== Twin towns – sister cities ==
Odintsovo is twinned with:

- Kruševac, Serbia
- Novopolotsk, Belarus
- Wittmund, Germany

=== Partners ===
- Kizlyar, Russia
- Sudzhansky District, Russia
