= Sygma =

Sygma may refer to:

- SYGMA Network, Inc., a wholly owned subsidiary of Sysco Corporation
- Sygma, or Sygma Photo News, a photography agency that was purchased by Corbis and closed in 2010

== See also ==
- Sigma (disambiguation)
