= Maybe Baby (singer) =

Belarusian-Russian singer (born 1995)

- Мэйби Бэйби
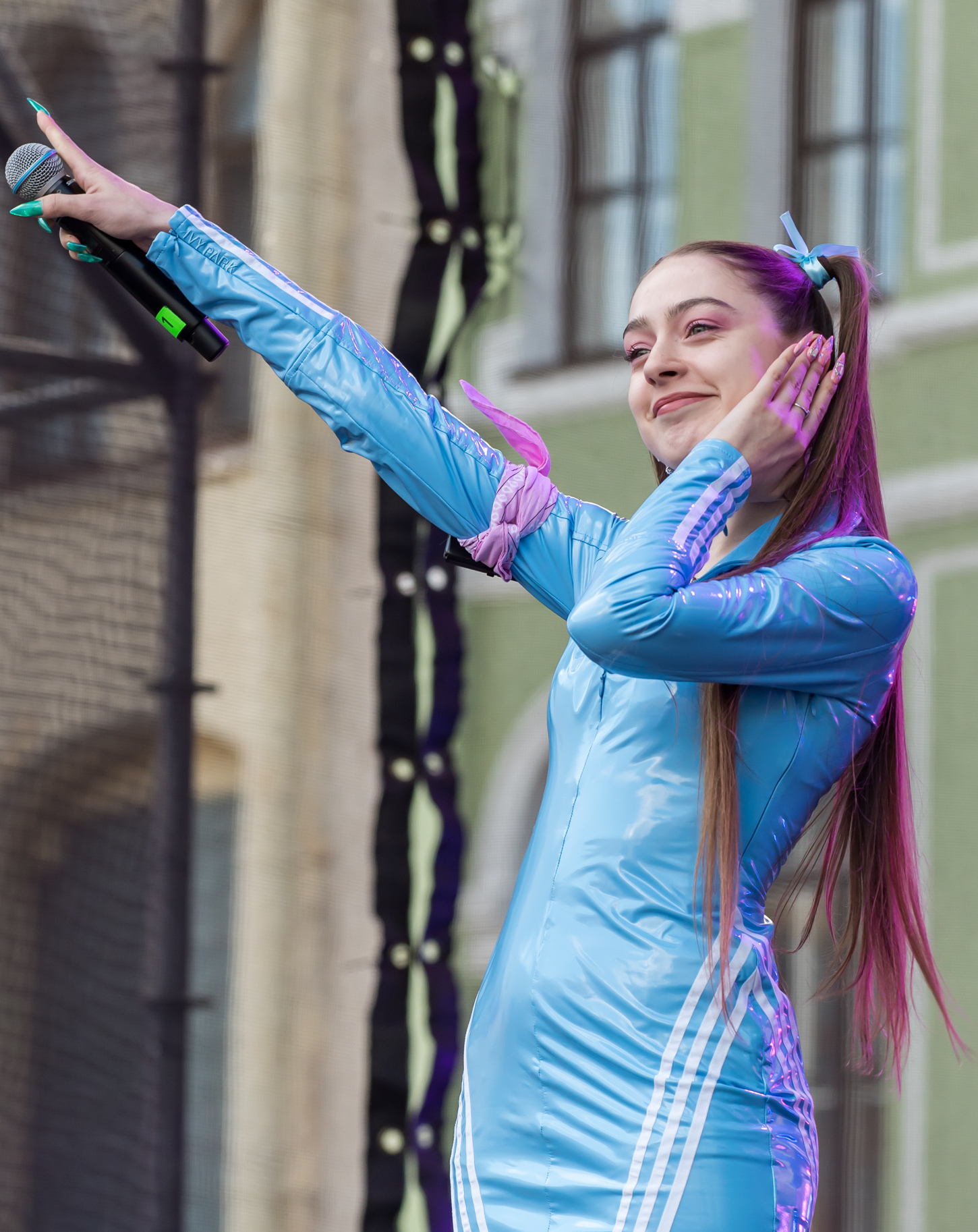
- Maybe Baby at Teen City Day, St. Petersburg, Russia
- Born: Viktoriya Vladimirovna Lysyuk; 27 September 1995 (age 31); Zhabinka, Brest Region, Belarus
- Musical career
- Occupations: Rapper; singer
- Instrument: Vocals
- Years active: 2018–present
- Labels: Streaming Club; Rhymes Music

Viktoriya Vladimirovna Lysyuk (Russian: Викто́рия Влади́мировна Лысю́к; born 27 September 1995), known professionally as Maybe Baby (Мэйби Бэйби), is a Belarusian-born Russian pop singer and rap artist.

== Early life ==
Victoria Lysyuk was born in the city of Zhabinka in the Brest Region of Belarus. She studied in Russia where she graduated from the St. Petersburg State Transport University.

== Career ==
In 2017, she joined the pop-rock project group Frendzona, which she was chosen for due to her "cross-genre musical knowledge", especially in K-pop.

On 13 June 2018 Maybe Baby released a solo single titled "Ascorbinka" ascorbic acid). On 4 March 2019 a remixed version, "Ascorbinka 2.0", and music video were released. As of 2021, this track remains the most recognizable amongst the works of Frendzona, and its music video remains the most viewed on the Frendzona channel as of 2024.

On 24 July 2018 Maybe Baby released a solo EP titled If Only on the Cheek (Только если в щёчку).

In May 2019, the single "Favorite School" (Любимая школа) was released. On 11 October 2019, the song "Tamagotchi" (Тамагочи) was released, a duet with Russian singer Alyona Shvets.

On 34 July 2020 a duet with Dora titled "I Won't Change" (Не исправлюсь) was released. In September, the music video for the song with Dora was released. On 30 July 2020 the song "Ahegao" (Ахегао) was released, followed by "Bla Bla" (Бла Бла) on November 18, and on December 2, the song "Poka Molodoy" (Пока молодой) was released in collaboration with the Russian group 'Хлеб'. In September 2020, Maybe Baby participated in the Russian comedian Maxim Galkin's show Muzykaliti alongside Russian singer Dmitry Malikov.

On 16 February 2021 the track "Planet M" (Планета М) and its animated music video were released. On 18 June "Banda-propaganda" (Банда-пропаганда) in collaboration with KROKI (Vladimir Galat) was released. On 14 December 2021 the duet with the Russian singer Dora titled "Barbiceyes" (Барбисайз) was released. On 11 February 2022 the track "sH1pu4Ka!" was released. On 18 February 2022 the song "Hinata" (Хината) with LXNER was released for his album Elysium.

After the disbandment of the project group Frendzona, the announcement was made regarding the work on the first full-length album titled Maybeland (Мэйбилэнд).

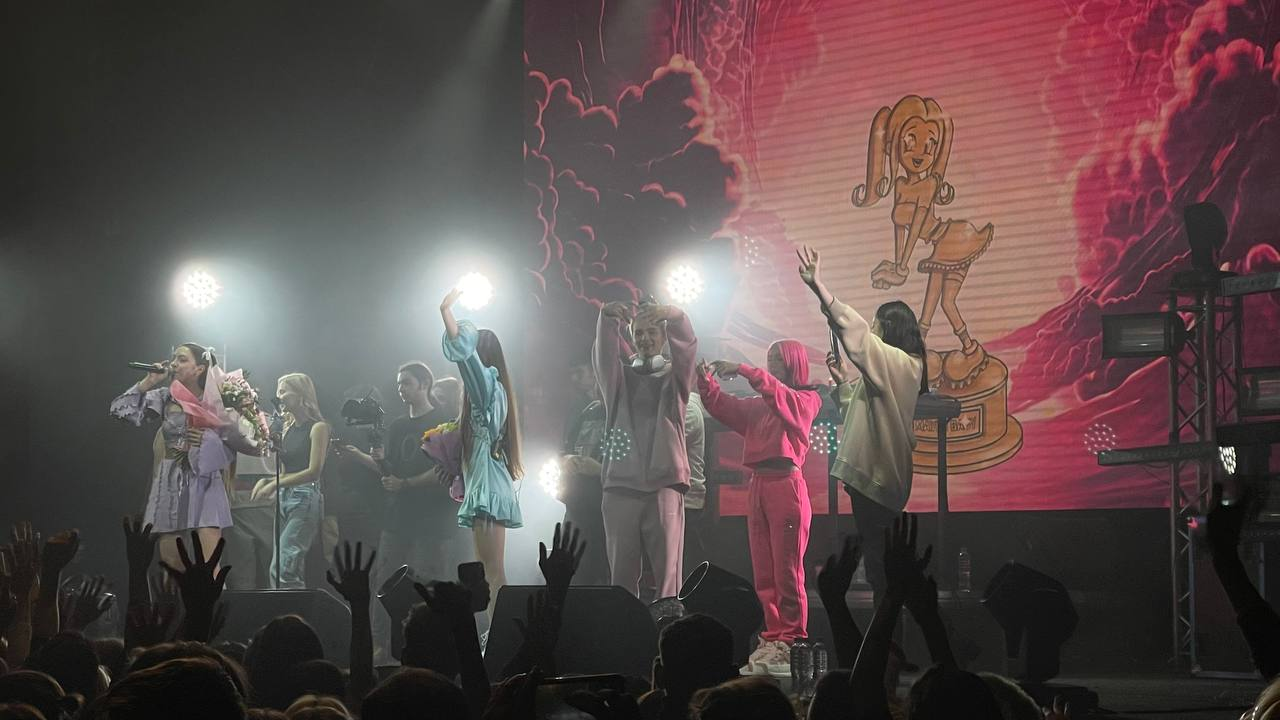
Concert in Moscow on 1 December 2022

On 7 May 2022 Maybe Baby released a diss track aimed at fellow Russian rapper Instasamka. On 27 May 2022 a track titled "Pain" (Боль) with Russian hip hop artist quiizzzmeow was released for his album Despersion.

On 29 July 2022 the track "Дакимакура" (Dakimakura) was released. On 8 August 2022 the track and music video for "Maybe F**king Baby" were released from the album Мэйбилэнд. Just a day later, on 9 August 2022, her debut studio album Мэйбилэнд (ru) was released, consisting of 16 tracks.

On 24 March 2023 the track "Zayka" (Зайка) was released. On 12 May the track "Shimmy Shimmy Ya!" was released.

On 17 November 2023 Maybe Baby released her second studio album Shawty, exclusively on the VK Music platform.

== Personal life ==
In a 2020 interview, she identified herself as bisexual.

== Discography ==
=== Studio albums ===
| Name | Details |
|---|---|
| Мэйбилэнд (Maybeland) | Released: 19 August 2022; Label: Streaming Club • Rhymes; Format: Digital distribution |
| Shawty | Released: 17 November 2023; Label: Streaming Club • Rhymes; Format: Digital distribution |

=== Mini-albums ===
| Name | Description |
|---|---|
| Только если в щёчку (If Only on the Cheek) | Released: 24 July 2018; Label: Rhymes Music; Format: Digital Distribution |

=== Singles ===
| Title | Year | Charts | | |
| Title | Year | CIS | | |
| Title | Year | TopHit Top Radio & YouTube Hits | TopHit Top Radio Hits | TopHit Top YouTube Hits |
|---|---|---|---|---|
| "Аскорбинка" | 2018 | 24 | — | 3 |
| "Аскорбинка 2.0" | 2019 | — | — | — |
| "Любимая школа" | 2019 | — | — | 71 |
| "Бесконечное лето" | 2019 | — | — | — |
| "Тамагочи" (collaboration with Alyona Shvets) | 2019 | — | — | — |
| "Не исправлюсь" (collaboration with Дора) | 2020 | — | — | — |
| "Ахегао" | 2020 | — | — | — |
| "Бла Бла" | 2020 | — | — | — |
| "Пока молодой" (collaboration with «Хлеб») | 2020 | — | — | — |
| "Планета М" | 2021 | — | — | — |
| "Банда-пропаганда" (collaboration with Кроки) | 2021 | — | — | — |
| "Лаллипап" | 2021 | — | — | — |
| "Барбисайз" (collaboration with Дора) | 2021 | — | — | — |
| "sH1pu4Ka!" | 2022 | — | — | — |
| "Боль" (collaboration with quiizzzmeow) | 2022 | — | — | — |
| "Дакимакура" | 2022 | — | — | — |
| "Мотылёк" (collaboration with IOWA) | 2022 | — | — | — |
| "Зайка" (Bunny) | 2023 | — | — | — |
| "Shimmy Shimmy Ya!" | 2023 | — | — | — |
| "Babybars" | 2023 | — | — | — |
| "Барби из трущоб" (Barbie from the Slums) | 2023 | — | — | — |
| "Babybars 2" | 2023 | — | — | — |

=== Collaborations ===
| Name | Year | Other Artist(s) | Album |
|---|---|---|---|
| Хината | 2022 | LXNER | Elysium |
| Барбисайз | 2022 | Dora | Miss |
| Девочка с косичками | 2022 | нексюша | «И смех и грех» |
