= Sigma, Lee County, Virginia =

Unincorporated community in Virginia, United States

Sigma, Virginia
- Unincorporated community
- Location within Virginia Location within the United States
- Coordinates: 36°49′48″N 82°56′12″W
- Country: United States
- State: Virginia
- County: Lee
- Elevation: 1,988 ft (606 m)
- Time zone: UTC−5 (Eastern (EST))
  - Summer (DST): UTC−4 (EDT)
- GNIS feature ID: 1496225

Sigma is an unincorporated community in Lee County, Virginia, United States.
