= News propaganda =

Propaganda packaged as credible news

News propaganda is a type of propaganda covertly packaged as credible news, but without sufficient transparency concerning the news item's source and the motivation behind its release. Transparency of the source is one parameter critical to distinguish between news propaganda and traditional news press releases and video news releases. The accuracy of this type of information, or lack thereof, puts the propaganda into the Black Propaganda or Gray Propaganda categories.

As with any propaganda, news propaganda may be spread for widely different reasons including governance, political or ideological motivations, partisan agendas, religious or ethnic reasons, and commercial or business motivations; their purposes are not always clear. News propaganda also can be motivated by national security reasons, especially in times of war or domestic upheaval.

Jason Stanley, who is an American philosopher and professor of philosophy at Yale University, he defines the characteristics of propaganda as the service of either supporting or eroding ideals. The first distinction between kinds of propaganda has to do with whether or not it erodes or supports the ideals it appears to embody. This is the distinction between supporting and undermining propaganda.

== Use ==
=== Print media ===
Historically, print outlets have been a less common source of news propaganda than other forms of media. It can be more difficult for some heavily influential information that leans one way or another to get through all individuals involved in sending an article to print in a new paper or magazine, although it is more likely for propaganda to be spread through print publications in developing countries.

=== Broadcasting ===
Going back as early as World War II, radio has been used as a form through which news propaganda could be disseminated – the government of Nazi Germany used radio to spread its ideals throughout Europe, as well as the United Kingdom, to drum up sympathy from countries like the US when the Germans had the upper hand.

Television dominated as a main source for propaganda from its creation, particularly in the United States. News channels reportedly have a tremendous amount of control over content and with the rise of the 24-hour news cycle, more networks are looking to release information regardless of its validity.

=== New media ===
The phenomenon of new media, and social media in particular, has made the spread of certain ideas more accessible to the wider public. By extension, it is also easier for posts to be spread and viewed by larger audiences, who are more likely to perceive them as facts if they have a larger footprint. This type of environment has been used by state and non-state actors as a common method of deploying propaganda, as well as information warfare.

== See also ==
- Advocacy journalism
- Freedom of the Press
- Infoganda
- Journalism ethics and standards
- Journalism scandals
- Propaganda model
