= Rhymes Music =

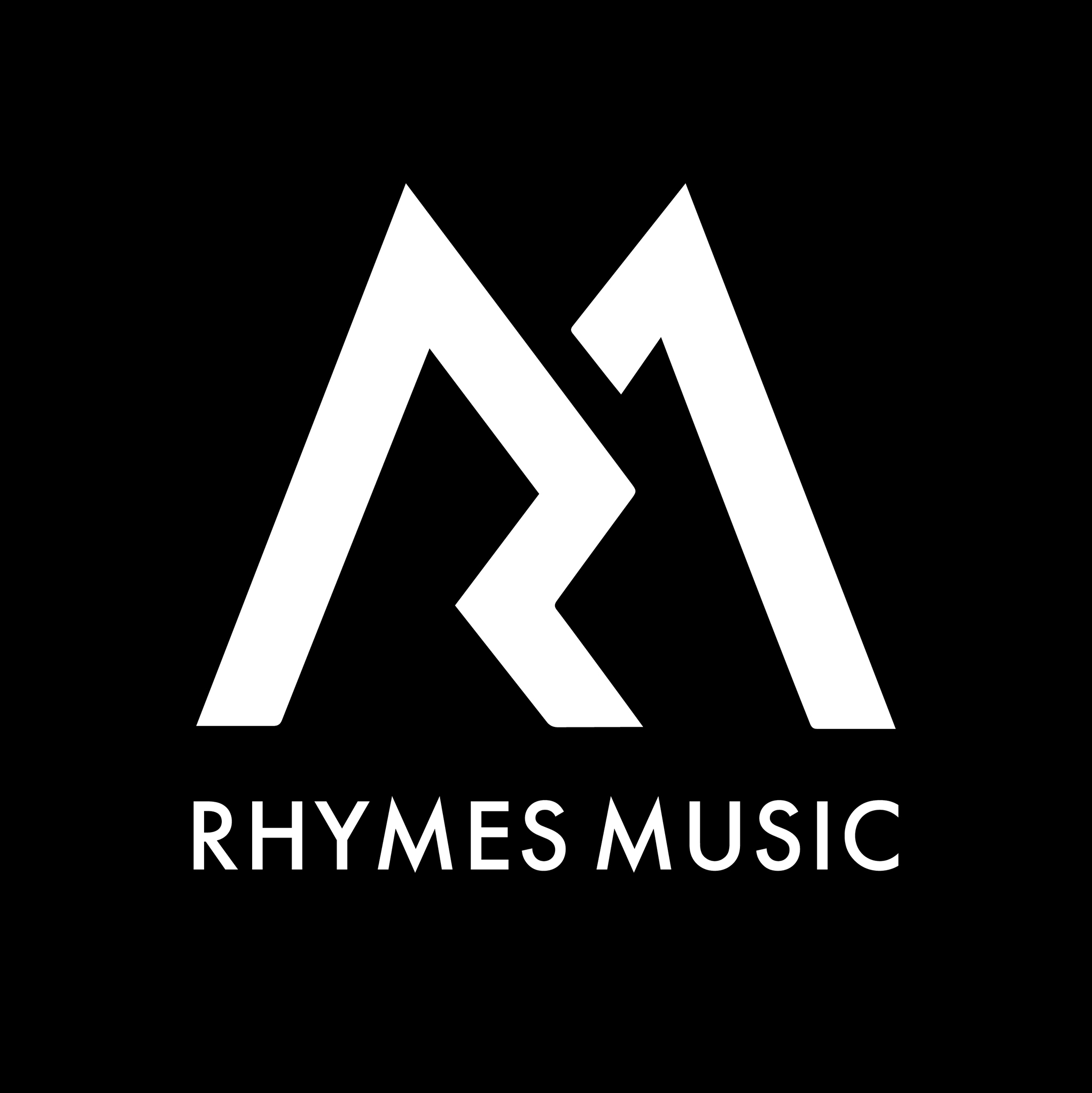
- Founded: 2011
- Founder: Mikhail Panshin
- Distributor: The Orchard
- Genre: Popular music
- Country of origin: Russia

Rhymes Music is a music label of the "Rhymes and Punches" community, founded in 2011.

== History ==
In 2011, Mikhail Panshin founded the label "Rhymes Booking." Initially, it was a music company engaged in the promotion of musical artists in the media sphere. On July 13, 2017, the enterprise was renamed "Rhymes Music" and officially registered as a label, with Rim Yasaviev as the director and Mikhail Panshin as the founder. Currently, the label is one of the largest publishers in Russia. In 2018, the group "Frendzona" was formed, and Panshin signed the group to his label almost immediately. For a long time, it was believed that Mikhail was the group's producer; however, the group members themselves did not confirm this, though they stated that Panshin indeed helped the group with promotion. Since that same year, the label has been involved in organizing concerts. In 2021, a protocol was filed against the label regarding drug propaganda in the tracks of Morgenshtern and Eldzhey, but the court did not proceed with the case. In the same year, the producer of Tima Belorusskikh filed a lawsuit in the arbitration court against the label due to the publication of the artist's songs and music videos on the "Rhymes Music" website. In 2022, the sub-label "SAVAGE$TATION" was founded, aimed at a foreign audience with genres such as hyperpop, phonk, and trap. Two years later, in 2024, the sub-label "eclipse media" was launched, focused on the SoundCloud scene. It specialises in marketing and content creation for artists, and works with fallen777angel, dope17, LXNER, Rakovaya Vykhukhol and Volhey, among others.

== Label artists ==
=== Current artists ===
- Dora
- Deti Rave
- Gunwest
- By India
- Mukka
- Kis-kis
- Pyrokinesis
- Sqwoz Bab
- Ivan Valeev
- Maybe Baby
- Aikko
- Playingtheangel
- Polmateri
- DLB
- Aleks Ataman & Finik
- Bodiev
- Xassa
- Lxner
- Quiizzzmeow
- Ruslan Utyug
- Xmax
- Pokrapiva
- Loren
- Kvestar
- Finik
- 4Etvergov
- Betsy

=== Former artists ===
- Frendzona
- Morgenshtern
- Alyona Shvets
- Soda Luv
- Galat
- Mayklav
- Tima Belorusskikh
- Ramil’
- Egor Nats
- Yung Trappa
- Tvoya Molodost
- 044 Rose
- Jizus
- STED.D
- Rickey F
- Dirty Ramirez
- Papin Olimpos
- Chistaya Mut
- Asper X
