= Bigo Live =

Live streaming service

- The logo of Bigo Live
- Website type: Live streaming
- Available in: 23 languages
- Owner: Bigo Technology (JOYY)
- Founder: David Li
- Website: www.bigo.tv
- Commercial: Yes/No
- Registration: Yes
- Launched: February 2018; 8 years ago
- Current status: Active

Bigo Live is a global social live streaming platform. As of 2019, Bigo Technology is owned by Joyy Inc.

Viewers are able to support broadcasters through in-app gifts. Bigo also owns Likee, a short video editing and hosting app.

== History ==
Bigo was launched in February 2018 and on iOS and Android platforms.

The app was removed from Apple's App Store globally on 9 April 2023. It remained accessible on Play Store, and the company did not publicly comment on the removal. Chinese media reports suggested the removal may have been related to violations with advertising regulations, which include some user privacy protections.

A December 2024 report from The New York Times discussed the use of live-streaming apps "downloaded from Apple and Google" for paid sexual exploitation of children, with Bigo Live being named among the others. Bigo Live was removed from Google's Play Store shortly after and federal investigation was launched into the potential child sexual abuse and child pornography on the platform.

== Controversies ==
In 2020, CNN investigation reported that the short sellers estimated that about “90% of the revenue that Joyy/Bigo has reported from YY Live is fraudulent.” CNN also reported that many of those paying users are actually computer bots that can be linked to Joyy’s internet servers. “Joyy is almost entirely fraudulent,” Muddy Waters founder Carson Block said to CNN, “Almost everything in terms of revenue, profits and paying users is fake.”

In July 2020, Pakistan temporarily banned Bigo, and warned TikTok and YouTube over immoral, obscene, and vulgar content. The Pakistan Telecommunication Authority expressed concerns about the potential negative impact on society, particularly on youth. The Pakistan Telecommunication Authority announced the lifting of the ban on 30 July 2020 following discussions and reassurances regarding content regulation.

On 13 June 2021, the Criminal Investigation Department (CID) of Bangladesh Police arrested five people, including Bigo's Operation Manager, a Chinese national, in connection with allegations of money laundering and blackmail. They were charged under the Anti-Money Laundering Act, Digital Security Act and Pornography Prevention Act.

Over 1000+ verified users at Trust pilot alleged fraud, stolen funds, and also voiced concerns about moderation, inappropriate content, and the potential for scams.
