= Maybe Baby (EP) =

EP by Blitzen Trapper
- Released: April 16, 2011
- Genre: Alternative country
- Label: Sub Pop

Maybe Baby is a 7 Inch EP by American country band Blitzen Trapper, released on April 16, 2011.

== Track listing ==
1. "Maybe Baby"
2. "Soul Singer"
