= SIGMA (verification service) =

Television advertising verification service

SIGMA was an electronic verification service offered by Nielsen Media Research and used to track broadcast airplay of commercials, infomercials, video news releases, public service announcements, satellite media tours, and electronic press kits.

The video tracking service worked by inserting a SIGMA encoder ID, along with the date and time of encoding, into lines 20 and 22 of the analog video signal. This placement was within the vertical blanking interval, outside the area displayed on a standard television screen, similar to how analog closed captioning was transmitted. On a professional video monitor with underscan activated, or on a computer display showing the entire video frame, the SIGMA data appeared as small, moving white lines at the top of the frame. Using this data, Nielsen provided overnight reports of airplay across television markets.

As broadcasting moved from analog to digital, analog encoding became largely obsolete and the industry shifted to digital watermarking. In March 2026, Nielsen announced the termination of its long-running SIGMA Radio monitoring service, with final reports delivered in April 2026, and discontinued the remaining SIGMA services.
