= FIGMA =

Finnish video game trade and rating organization

- Merged into: Association for the Nordic Game Industry
- Formation: 1999; 27 years ago
- Dissolved: January 1, 2016; 10 years ago
- Type: Non-profit, self-regulatory
- Purpose: Trade association, Rating of video game content
- Location: Helsinki, Finland
- Region served: Finland
- Website: figma.fi (archived)

The Finnish Games and Multimedia Association (FIGMA) was a Finnish trade association for video game publishers and distributors founded in 1999.

It also acted a video game rating board, to regulates video game content in relation to subjects such as sex and violence and assigns age appropriate certificates. Figma published the best-selling video games every two weeks, and gave out platinum and gold prizes. It also kept yearly statistics on the size of the Finnish video game market, and organized the Finnish Game Awards from 2008 to 2013.

FIGMA dissolved in 2016 when it merged with three other Nordic trade associations (the Swedish MDTS, Danish MUF, and Norwegian NSM) into the Association for the Nordic Game Industry (ANGI).

== History ==
Figma was founded on 12 April 1999. Vesa Artman, Head of Nordisk Film's PlayStation unit, was the first chairman and was responsible for the practical activities. Riku Olkkonen was elected as the association's first executive director in March 2007.

== Organisation ==
Figma was the Finnish representative for Association for the Nordic Game Industry (ANGI) in Finland, whose member companies in 2016 were Activision Blizzard, AMO, Bergsala, Electronic Arts, Game Outlet, Koch Media, Microsoft, Nordic License, Namco Bandai Partners, Nordisk Film, PAN Vision, Ubisoft, Walt Disney Company and Warner Brothers.

Figma was a member of the European Games Federation (ISFE) and the Media Education Centre Metka. The organisation cooperated with the State Film Inspectorate in areas such as the control of age limits and had a representative on the advisory board that planned the activities of the Inspectorate.

Figma's Board was chaired by Riku Olkkonen and its executive director was Thomas Westerberg.

== Activities ==
The purpose of the association was "to improve the cultural policy status and legal protection of recorded music and the conditions for its production, import and distribution, and to develop the enforcement of the rights of rightholders under the law".

Figma published a bi-weekly list of best-selling video games, awarded platinum and gold game prizes, maintained annual statistics on the size of the Finnish video game market and organised the Finnish Game Awards from 2008 to 2013.
