= STS Kids =

Russian TV channel (founded 1996)

- Country: Russia
- Headquarters: Moscow, Russia

Programming
- Language: Russian
- Picture format: HDTV 1080i SDTV 576i

Ownership
- Owner: CTC Media

History
- Launched: 5 July 2018; 8 years ago

Links
- Website: www.ctc.ru (Russia only)

STS Kids (Also known as CTC Kids) is a Russian television channel aimed at children owned by CTC Media. It features child stars such as Svetlana Chertischeva also known as Betsy and Maria Yankovskaya. Available on cable and satellite, it started regular broadcasts on July 6, 2018, and its programming is mainly geared towards education and entertainment. The channel is part of the structure of JSC STS and is not an independent structure in its own right.

== History ==
STS director-general Vyacheslav Murugov mooted the idea of a dedicated children's channel in July 2014, tentatively named STS Deti. It was initially planned to launch alongside STS Love (which launched in February). It is unknown why was the project shelved.

The channel ended up launching on July 6, 2018. The channel was created by recommendation of specialists of the Department of Psychology of the University of Moscow. Language learning programming produced for the channel was also included, and the channel had two audio tracks (Russian and original). At launch, STS Kids found the kids' market to be extremely competitive, making the channel hard to compete in the sector. The channel's graphics were designed by Kira Laskari, STS Love's CEO.

In April 2019, the channel expanded its distribution to Belarus, initially on Beltelecom's television platform ZALA.

== Programming ==
=== Original Programming ===
- CubicCat
- Detective Finnick
- Kid-E-Cats
- Lex and Plu: Space Taxi Drivers
- Little Tiaras
- Sheep's Hotel
- Yoko

=== Acquired Programming ===
- Adventurer Carly. Ancient Kingdom
- Alisa Knows What to Do!
- All Hail King Julien
- Bananimals
- Big Blue
- The Boss Baby: Back in Business
- The Cat in the Hat Knows a Lot About That!
- Pin-Code 2.0
- Counterfeit Cat
- Dawn of the Croods
- Doki
- Droners
- Egyxos
- Ernest & Rebecca
- Fast & Furious Spy Racers
- The Fixies
- Get Ace
- Jade Armor
- The Jungle Bunch
- KikoRiki
- Legends of Spark
- Leopold the Cat
- Madagascar: A Little Wild
- The Mighty Ones
- The Mr. Peabody & Sherman Show
- Nefertine on the Nile
- Olivia
- Pac-Man and the Ghostly Adventures
- Sonic Boom
- Supernatural Academy
- Super Monsters
- Skylanders Academy
- Spirit Riding Free
- Taffy
- The Tales of Wonder Keepers
- Tinga Tinga Tales
- Trolls: The Beat Goes On!
- Trulli Tales
- Wild Kratts
- Wolf
- Where's Waldo?
- Zak Jinks
