= Video news release =

A video news release (VNR) is a video segment made to look like a news report, but is instead created by a PR firm, advertising agency, marketing firm, corporation, government agency, or non-profit organization. They are provided to television newsrooms to shape public opinion, promote commercial products and services, publicize individuals, or support other interests. News producers may air VNRs, in whole or in part, at their discretion or incorporate them into news reports if they contain information appropriate to a story or of interest to viewers.

Critics of VNRs have called the practice deceptive or a propaganda technique, particularly when the segment is not identified to the viewers as a VNR. Firms producing VNRs disagree and equate their use to a press release in video form and point to the fact that editorial judgement in the worthiness, part or whole, of a VNR's content is still left in the hands of journalists, program producers or the like. The United States Federal Communications Commission is currently investigating the practice of VNRs.

== Details ==
Most VNRs feature a professional news reporter, someone with on-air news experience, or an actor. VNRs also often include interviews with experts (who often have legitimate, if biased, expertise); so called "man on the street" interviews with "average" people; and pictures of celebrities, products, service demonstrations, corporate logos and the like, where applicable. In some cases the "man on the street" segments feature persons randomly selected and interviewed spontaneously, and in other cases actors are hired and directed by VNR producers to deliver carefully scripted comments. In addition, regardless of whether real people or professional actors appear, VNR producers and directors, just like journalists, have complete discretion to excerpt and edit these "interviews" into 'sound bites' that help make the point they are trying to make.

== Media broadcasting ==
Commercial television stations and other media outlets often broadcast only portions of a VNR. Sometimes they use the script provided by the VNR producer but frequently they write their own script.

In a report released on April 6, 2006, the Center for Media and Democracy listed detailed information on 77 television stations that it said had broadcast VNRs in the prior 10 months, and which VNRs had been broadcast. Most of these VNR uses were of partial feeds. However, CMD said that in each case the television station actively disguised the VNR content to make it appear to be its own reporting, and that more than one-third of the time, stations aired the pre-packaged VNR in its entirety.

== Business production in the United States ==
VNRs have been used extensively in business since at least the early 1980s. Corporations such as Microsoft and Philip Morris, and the pharmaceutical industry generally, have all made use of the technique.

According to the trade-group Public Relations Society of America, a VNR is the video equivalent of a press release. and presents a client's case in an attractive, informative format. The VNR placement agency seeks to garner media attention for the client's products, services, brands or other marketing goals. The VNR affords local TV stations free broadcast quality materials for use in reports offered by such stations.

Public Relations agencies have their video tapes encoded allowing very accurate tracking of where such video is used. (see: SIGMA (verification service) for additional information).

One critic of the VNR technique, John Stauber, an observer and critic of the Public Relations business says, "These fellows are whistling past the graveyard, assuring themselves that this all is no big deal. There was no hint of shame, certainly no apologizing, just apparent disdain for having their business practices dissected on the front page of the New York Times. They are proud of their work."

- The New York Times reported in March 2005 that "In all, at least 20 federal agencies, including the Defense Department and the Census Bureau, have made and distributed hundreds of television news segments in the past four years, records and interviews show. Many were subsequently broadcast on local stations across the country without any acknowledgement of the government's role in their production."
- A VNR financed by the Department of Health and Human Services was aired on a number of local news programs around the country, as conventional journalism when in fact, it was produced to promote the new Medicare plan. The creation of the Karen Ryan video, named so because of the on-screen "reporter," was ruled in May 2004 to be in violation of federal law by the General Accounting Office (GAO), the investigative arm of the U.S. government.
- In September, 2005, the GAO concluded that the Department of Education had violated the law when it distributed a similar video news release using Karen Ryan as a "reporter" touting the No Child Left Behind program of the Bush administration. In May 2003 the Department had hired the Ketchum public relations firm; the contract specified, among other things, that the firm create "audio products, videos and some print materials that present clear, coherent, targeted messages regarding ED’s programs and that relate to the Department’s legislative initiatives".
- A website of the Census Bureau informs visitors: "U.S. Census Bureau Video News Feeds are available for creation of state-specific news reports. Targeted comments are provided by Census Bureau Redistricting Data Office Chief, Marshall Turner. Companion notification material includes references to websites for the newly released information. Please contact...Homefront Communications for hardcopies on Betacam SP and faxed/email notification copy."
- In May 2020, multiple television stations aired a PR piece produced by Amazon.com that defended its response to the COVID-19 pandemic, with anchors reading off an identical script vertabatim.

== VNRs and U.S. law ==
- In January 1948, the U.S. Information and Educational Exchange Act of 1948, also known as the Smith-Mundt Act, was passed by Congress and signed into law by U.S. President Harry Truman, placing international overseas information activities, including VOA, under an Office of International Information at the Department of State.
- In February 2005, the "Stop Government Propaganda Act" was introduced in the U.S. Senate. It was referred to the Judiciary Committee and no further action occurred.
- In April 2005, the Federal Communications Commission warned television stations that they could be fined for airing news stories provided by the government and by companies without disclosing who made them.
- In May 2006, FCC chairman Kevin Martin ordered a review of airing of VNRs by television stations, following the April 2006 report by the Center for Media and Democracy.
- In August 2006, the FCC mailed letters to the owners of 77 television stations, asking for information regarding agreements between the stations and the creators of VNRs. The letters also asked whether there was any "consideration" given to the stations in return for airing the material. Stations were given 60 days to respond.

== See also ==
- Fake news
- Infoganda
- Journalism ethics and standards
- News propaganda

== Video and audio links ==
- A New Age of "Fake News", WBUR 17 March 2005
- Audio and video coverage of the issue from Democracy Now!
- PBS report on U.S. Government using VNRs as covert propaganda
- Judge Jeanine - Owning a gun is my God given right!
- Here's how Conan O'Brien Gets News Anchors to Say The Same Thing
