= Betsy (Russian singer) =

Russian singer (born 2013)

Betsy Бэтси
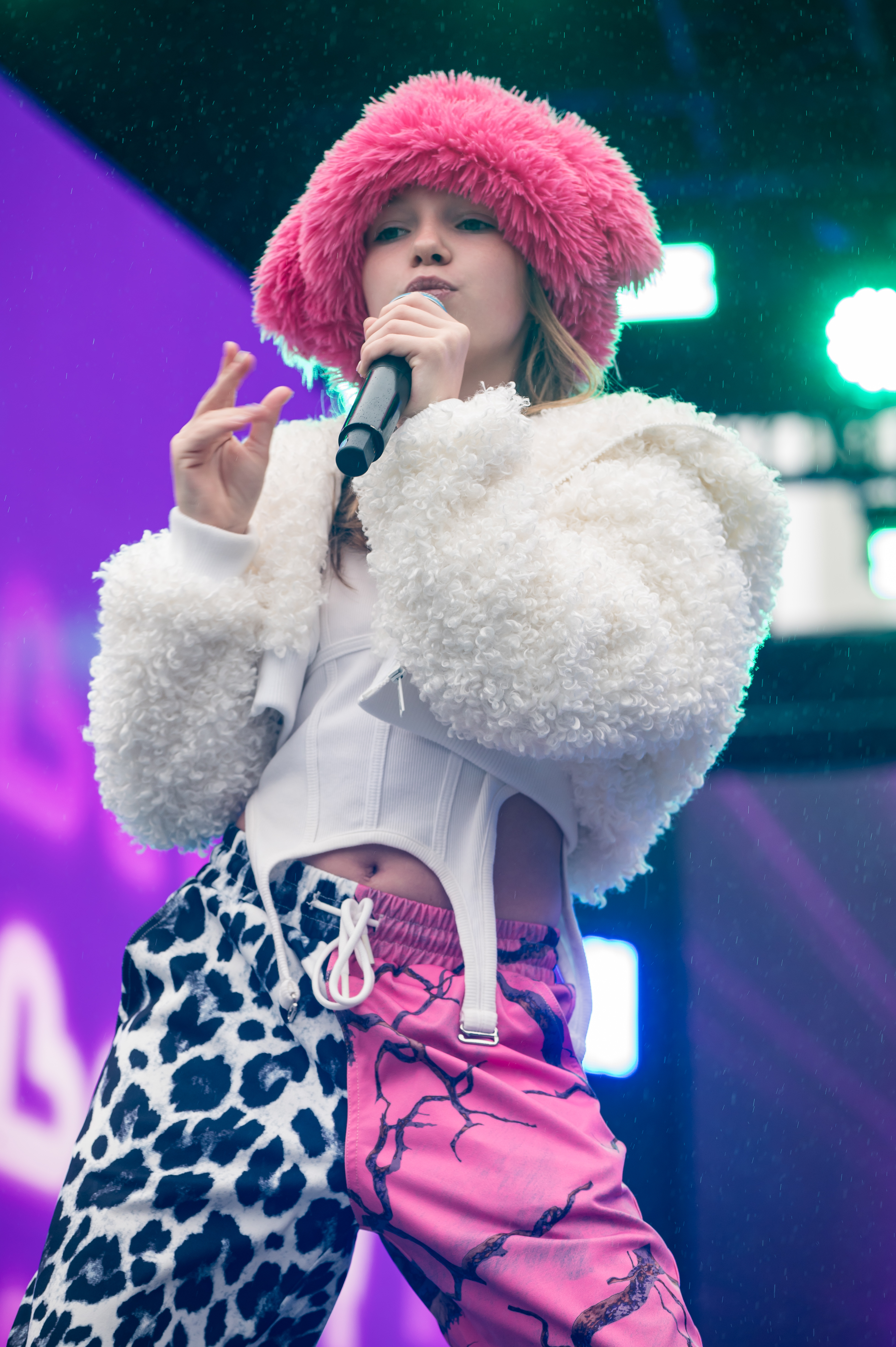
- Betsy in 2025

Background information
- Born: Svetlana Mikhaylovna Chertischeva; 27 January 2013 (age 13); St. Petersburg, Russia
- Genre: Pop
- Occupations: Singer, blogger
- Years active: 2018–present
- Label: Rhymes Music

Svetlana Mikhaylovna Chertischeva (Note: Russian: Светлана Михайловна Чертищева) (born 27 January 2013), known professionally as Betsy or Betsy Girl, is a Russian singer, rapper and YouTuber.

== Career ==
At the age of five, she opened her first video blog, that her parents helped her run. Her first video depicted her eating fruits and interacting with a soft toy. Her father is the composer Mikhail Chertishchev, who also writes all her songs.

Notably, her song in collaboration with twins M&A "Simple Dimple Pop It Squish" went viral on TikTok in 2021, with videos about stress-relief toys using the sound.

Other Betsy's songs that went viral on social media were "Я тебе поставлю лайк" ("I'll Give You a Like") and "Pump It Up".

In the spring of 2024, she released a song titled "Я не пон" (lit. "I Didn't Understand"), that was based on hate messages she had received on the Internet. She commented to Bridge TV, "My song is about haters who are hating on me, and I'm replying to them that I don't get what you are saying and you won't succeed (in shutting me up) because I have my own opinion, and (my opinion) is more important than a hater's opinion." Her father added, "(What we want to say in this song) is that despite all the hate we are always ready to go on and do what we like, and we see that (our songs) resonate (with people), both positively and negatively." In July, a music video for the song was released. It was directed by Rodion Chistyakov, who explained, "In this video, we have three people who, so to say, don't like children: a middle-aged couch potato, a hipster, and a schoolmistress". The video also starred Betsy's little sister Suzy and featured a dance that Betsy invented herself.

In October 2024, she and TV star Maria Iankovskaia released the single "Sigma Boy", which went viral on social media apps such as TikTok and also charted on Spotify, YouTube, Shazam, and iTunes. The song topped Spotify's Global Viral Hits playlist.

In 2025, she was nominated for the Forbes 30 Under 30 list.

== Discography ==
=== Singles ===
| Title | Year |
|---|---|
| «Come On, Dad» | 2019 |
| «First Grader» | 2020 |
| «I'll Give You A Like» | 2020 |
| «Toad Bass» | 2020 |
| «I'll Like You» (MARTY Remix) | 2021 |
| «Simple Dimple Pop It Squish» (feat. M&A) | 2021 |
| «Simple Dimple Pop It Squish» (Slowed + Reverb Remix) (feat. M&A) | 2021 |
| «GOLD APPLE» (feat. M&A) | 2021 |
| «Frank» | 2021 |
| «Pump It Up» | 2021 |
| «Electrical Panel» | 2022 |
| «Little Russian Girl» (Snippet) | 2022 |
| «Capybara» (feat. Sto-Lichny Ona-Nas) | 2022 |
| «Bandit» or «A-Ya-Ya» | 2023 |
| «La La» | 2023 |
| «September 1st (It's Trash)» | 2023 |
| «Cats» | 2023 |
| «I'll Subscribe» | 2023 |
| «I Love You» | 2024 |
| «I Didn't Understand» | 2024 |
| «This Is My Mother» («Moonzy: Homecoming» OST) | 2024 |
| «Because I'm A Friend» («Moonzy: Homecoming» OST) | 2024 |
| «Sigma Boy» (feat. Anna-Maria Iankovskaia) | 2024 |
| «Sigma Boy» (Remix) (feat. Anna-Maria Iankovskaia, LAVINIA & Ely Oaks) | 2024 |
| «Sigma Boy» (Techno Remix) (feat. Anna-Maria Iankovskaia & BORIS REDWALL) | 2024 |
| «Sigma Boy» (Brazilian Funk Remix) (feat. Anna-Maria Iankovskaia, HXELLPLAYA & VILLYBON) | 2024 |
| «Queen Of Drama» | 2025 |
| «Delulu» (feat. Katya Lel) | 2025 |
| «Sigma Boy» (Remix) (feat. Anna-Maria Iankovskaia & DJ DimixeR) | 2025 |
| «If» («Family Album» album) (feat. Mikhail Chertischev) | 2025 |
| «Sad» (feat. Chibins) | 2025 |
| «Two Times Two Is Four» («My School» album) | 2025 |
| «Ex-BFF» | 2025 |
| «On New Year's Eve» (feat. Ded M) | 2025 |
| «I Love...» (Snippet) | 2026 |
| «Puberty» | 2026 |
| «W Zavoz» (feat. Ded M) | 2026 |
| «Paracetamol» (feat. Viki Show & Milana Khametova) | 2026 |
«Ladies" (feat. Mistress Evelyn)
