= Likee =

Social media short-video app

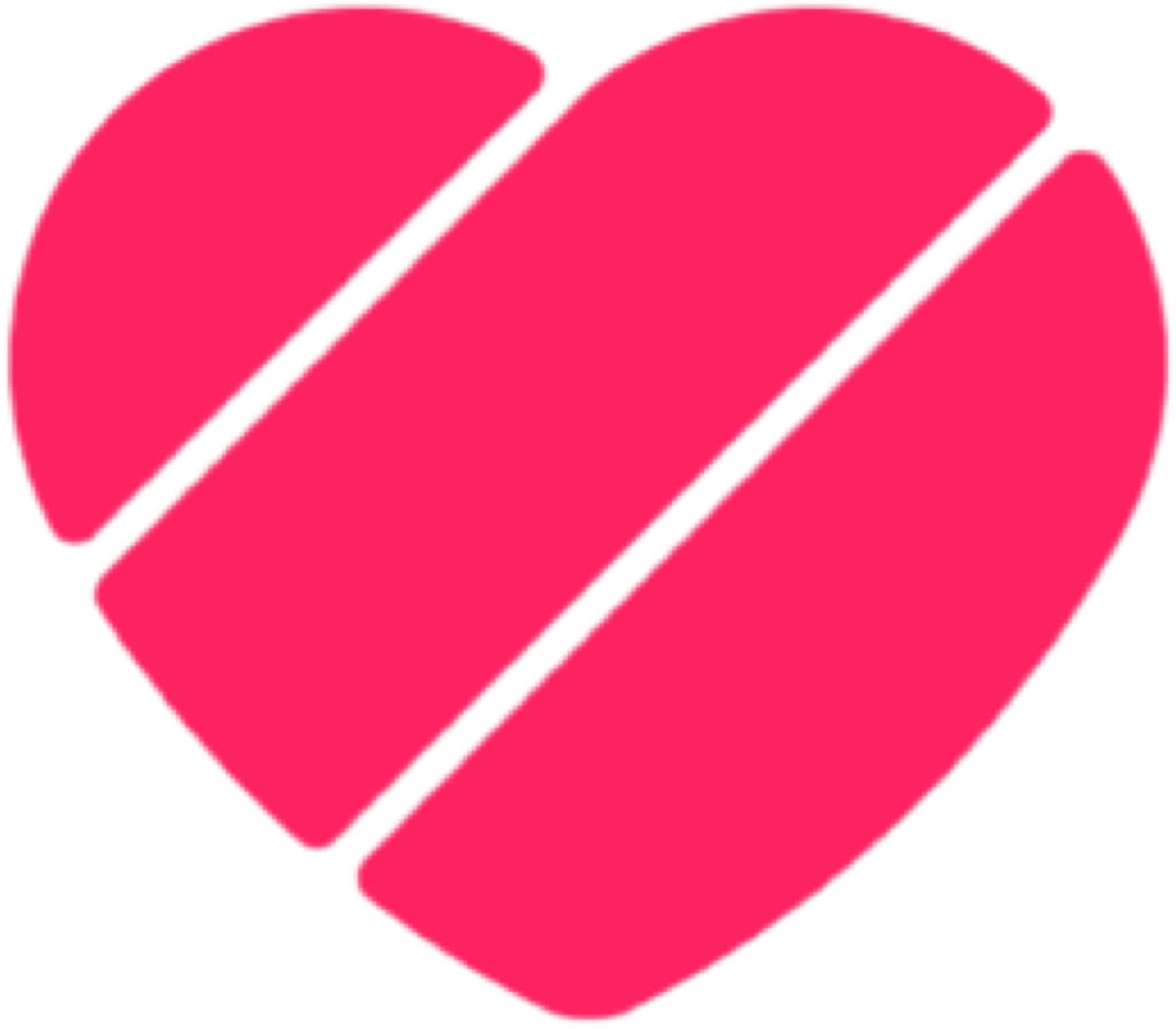
- Genre: Social-media app Video editing and sharing
- Predecessor: LIKE video
- Founded: January 2017; 9 years ago
- Products: Short video social platform
- Owner: Bigo (JOYY)
- Website: likee.video

Likee (/ˈlaɪkiː/; formerly LIKE) is a short-video creation and sharing app, available for iOS and Android operating systems. It is owned by Singaporean tech firm Likeme Pte. Ltd., whose parent company is JOYY Inc. The founder of Likee is Jason Hu, entrepreneur from Singapore, who previously worked for JOYY.

The app's capabilities include visual effects, including 4D Magic and Dynamic Stickers, as well as video shooting and editing.

== History ==
Likee was originally known as LIKE until mid-2019, when it was rebranded and redesigned.

As of the second quarter of 2019, Likee's mobile monthly active users had reached 80.7 million.

In 2017, Likee was rated as one of Google Play's Best Entertainment Applications.

== Features ==
The Likee mobile app allows users to easily create and edit videos using a variety of augmented reality effects.

== Privacy concerns ==
Likee has been criticized for privacy and inappropriate content.

In response to privacy concerns, LIKEME Pte. Ltd. added parental control features in 2019, allowing parents and guardians of Likee users to remotely control or restrict access to the app's content. However, watchdog groups have described the parental controls as "ineffective".

In response to the criticisms on the inappropriate content Likee hosted, Likee banned over 42,000 accounts from the platform.

In June 2020, the Government of India banned Likee along with 58 other apps that were ultimately owned by Chinese companies such as TikTok, citing data and privacy issues, and added that it was a threat to the sovereignty and security of the country. Border tensions in 2020 between India and China and subsequent deterioration of relations instigated the ban.

== See also ==
- TikTok
- Triller
- Huddles
