= Alpha and beta male =

Slang terms for men

Alpha male and beta male describe a perceived social hierarchy among men, originally derived from concepts in animal ethology. In a human context, an "alpha male" is typically defined as a man who is dominant, assertive, and occupies a high social or professional status, while a "beta male" is characterized as subordinate, less traditionally masculine, and having lower social standing. These terms were actually originally used by biologists to describe dominance hierarchies in social animals like chimpanzees and wolves; their application with regards to human behavior is widely regarded by scientists and experts as a scientific myth or a significant oversimplification.

The popularization of these terms in human contexts began in the late 20th century. Primatologist Frans de Waal's 1982 book Chimpanzee Politics suggested parallels between ape and human power structures, which led media outlets in the 1990s to apply "alpha" labels to successful business leaders. The concepts gained further visibility in the late 1990s and early 2000s through political commentary and the emergence of the pickup artist (PUA) community, which presented "alpha" status as an aspirational ideal for attracting romantic partners. Evolutionary psychologists have critiqued these models, noting that human social status is more accurately defined by a combination of dominance and "prestige," with the latter often being a more significant factor in social attraction.

In contemporary internet culture, the terms are frequently used within the manosphere, an online collection of forums and communities focused on masculinity and often characterized by misogyny and opposition to feminism. Within these spaces, "beta" is often used as a pejorative label for men perceived as weak or easily exploited by women, though it is also adopted as a self-identifier by members of certain subcultures, such as incels (involuntary celibates), who feel they lack the necessary attraction traits such as physical attractiveness. These communities have expanded the Greek-letter hierarchy to include related terms such as "sigma male," used to describe a solitary but high-status "lone wolf" who exists outside the traditional alpha-beta structure.

Claims that human mating preferences are "hard-wired" to favor alpha dominance are not supported by scientific research. Studies on human attraction suggest that while assertiveness and confidence are valued, aggressive or overly dominant behavior is often viewed negatively by romantic partners. Furthermore, the belief in an "alpha fux, beta bux" mating strategy—which posits that women seek sexual relationships with "alpha" types while using "beta" types for financial security—has been challenged by sociological data and genetic studies showing low historical rates of infidelity in Western populations.

== History ==
The terms were used almost solely in animal ethology prior to the 1990s, particularly in regard to mating privileges with females, ability to hold territory, and hierarchy in terms of food consumption within their herd or flock. In animal ethology, beta refers to an animal who is subordinate to higher-ranking members in the social hierarchy, thus having to wait to eat and having fewer or negligible opportunities for copulation.

In the 1982 book of Chimpanzee Politics: Power and Sex Among Apes, primatologist and ethologist Frans de Waal suggested that his observations of a chimpanzee colony could possibly be applied to human interactions. Some commentary on the book, including in the Chicago Tribune, discussed its parallels to human power hierarchies. In the early 1990s, some media outlets began to use the term alpha to refer to humans, specifically to "manly" men who excelled in business. Journalist Jesse Singal, writing in New York magazine, attributes the popular awareness of the terms to a 1999 Time magazine article, which described an opinion held by Naomi Wolf, who was at the time an advisor to then–presidential candidate Al Gore: "Wolf has argued internally that Gore is a 'Beta male' who needs to take on the 'Alpha male' in the Oval Office before the public will see him as the top dog." Singal also credits Neil Strauss's bestselling 2005 book on pickup artistry, titled The Game, for popularizing alpha male as an aspirational ideal.

== Usage ==
Both terms have been frequently used in internet memes. The term beta is used as a pejorative self-identifier among some members of the manosphere, particularly incels, who do not believe they are assertive or traditionally masculine, and feel overlooked by women. It is also used to negatively describe other men who are not deemed to be assertive, particularly with women.

The view that there is a dominance hierarchy among humans consisting of "alpha males" and "beta males" is sometimes reported in the mainstream media. The term alpha male is often applied to any dominating man, especially bullies, despite the fact that dominating behavior is rarely seen as a positive trait for either an ideal date or a romantic partner. Claims about women being "hard-wired" to desire "alpha males" are seen by experts as misogynistic and stereotypical, and are not supported by research. Evolutionary psychologists who study human mating behavior instead believe that humans use two distinct strategies – dominance and prestige – for climbing social hierarchies, and that prestige plays a significantly more important role in establishing men's attractiveness to women than does dominance. Cognitive scientist Scott Barry Kaufman summarizes:

Taken together, the research suggests that the ideal man (for a date or romantic partner) is one who is assertive, confident, easygoing, and sensitive, without being aggressive, demanding, dominant, quiet, shy, or submissive. In other words, a prestigious man, not a dominant man. In fact, it appears that the prestigious man who is high in both assertiveness and kindness is considered the most attractive to women for both short-term affairs and long-term relationships.

Misconceptions about "alpha males" are common within the manosphere, a collection of websites, blogs, and online forums promoting masculinity, strong opposition to feminism, and misogyny which includes movements such as the men's rights movement, incels (involuntary celibates), Men Going Their Own Way (MGTOW), and pick-up artists (PUA).

The term beta is also often used among manosphere communities to refer to men they consider easily taken advantage of or ignored by women. Its usage is inconsistent; media studies scholar Debbie Ging has described the communities' theories about "alpha, beta, omega, and zeta masculinity" as "confused and contradictory". Beta is sometimes used as self-identifier among men who do not embody hegemonic masculinity. It is also sometimes used by manospherians as a pejorative term for men who are or are perceived to be feminist, or who are thought to be acting as "white knights". Some manosphere groups refer to members of other groups in the manosphere as betas; for example, members of the MGTOW community sometimes use it to refer to men's rights activists or incels. Members of the pickup artist (PUA) communities use it to refer to men who cannot seduce women. Similar terms used by the manosphere communities include nice guy, cuck, simp, and soy boy.

'Alpha' and 'beta' are also used with other genders in online discourse, and other letters of the Greek alphabet (such as sigma) are used to define additional genres of men.

== Related terms ==
=== Sigma male ===
Sigma male is an internet slang term to describe solitary, masculine men. The term gained prominence within internet culture during the late 2010s and early 2020s, and has inspired numerous memes, graffitis and videos. It is used to denote a male who is equivalent to an alpha male but exists outside the alpha-beta male hierarchy as a "lone wolf". In the manosphere, it is regarded as the "rarest" kind of male. In 2023, #sigma gained over 46 billion views on the social media platform TikTok. In 2024, the Russian song "Sigma Boy" became viral on TikTok and charted on Spotify, YouTube and iTunes.

The term first appeared in a blog post by American writer Vox Day. Later, California plastic surgeon John T. Alexander published the book The Sigma Male: What Women Really Want. In 2018, the term appeared on YouTube and in 2021 it went viral after a tweet by Lily Simpson.

The term sigma male has also taken on an ironic and satirical meaning, often mocking the concept of the "manosphere" and the ideas of hustle culture with bizarre and nonsensical actions being considered part of the sigma male mindset or "grindset". On social media, the term is often used to describe idealistic, masculine fictional characters from films and TV shows. Notably, actor Christian Bale's portrayal of the character Patrick Bateman from the 2000 film American Psycho is often cited as an ideal representation of a "sigma male", both through memes and unironic discussion.

Beth Skwarecki, health editor of the weblog Lifehacker, describes the sigma male as a "bullshit concept from the incel world." Due to the term's attribution to fictional film characters, it has been highlighted as promoting unrealistic personality and beauty standards.

=== Alpha fux beta bux ===
In the manosphere, the term alpha fux beta bux (commonly abbreviated AF/BB) which is an altered spelling of the phrase "alpha fucks, beta bucks", presupposes a mating strategy of hypergamy or "marrying up" among women whereby they prefer the more masculine "alpha" males for sexual relationships but settle for less attractive but more compliant "beta" males for financial security. Sometimes it expresses a belief that women marry or establish (often sexless) long-term relationships with beta males out of convenience to exploit them financially, while continuing to keep options open for infidelity and extramarital sex with alpha males. Ging describes these beliefs as an effort by young men in the Western world to cope with their limited economic prospects after the 2008 financial crisis by appealing to gender-essentialist notions of gold-digging women popular in postfeminist culture.

The AF/BB belief has been supported by the unproven hypothesis that women frequently engage in a dual mating strategy, where they have affairs with men besides their partner while ovulating.

=== Beta orbiter ===
A beta orbiter is a beta male who invests time and effort into mingling with women in the hope of eventually getting into a romantic relationship or having sex with them. The term earned some media attention in 2019 with the murder of Bianca Devins. Brandon Clark killed the 17-year-old Devins and posted photographs of her body online, one of which bore the caption, "sorry fuckers, you're going to have to find somebody else to orbit."

=== Beta uprising ===
The term beta uprising or incel rebellion has been used largely among incels to refer to violence committed by members of their community against those they see as enemies. It is also sometimes used to describe a movement to overthrow what they view as an oppressive, feminist society. A 2018 vehicle-ramming attack in Toronto, Canada, was perpetrated by a man who had posted on his Facebook page just prior to the attack, "the Incel Rebellion has already begun". Media outlets have used the terms beta uprising and incel rebellion to refer to acts of violence perpetrated by members of manosphere communities, particularly incels.

== See also ==
- Alpha male
- Chad (slang)
- Internet slang
- Neckbeard (slang)
- Omegaverse
