= Alyona Shvets =

Russian singer-songwriter, poet, composer, and musician (born 2001)

Alyona Shvets Алёна Швец
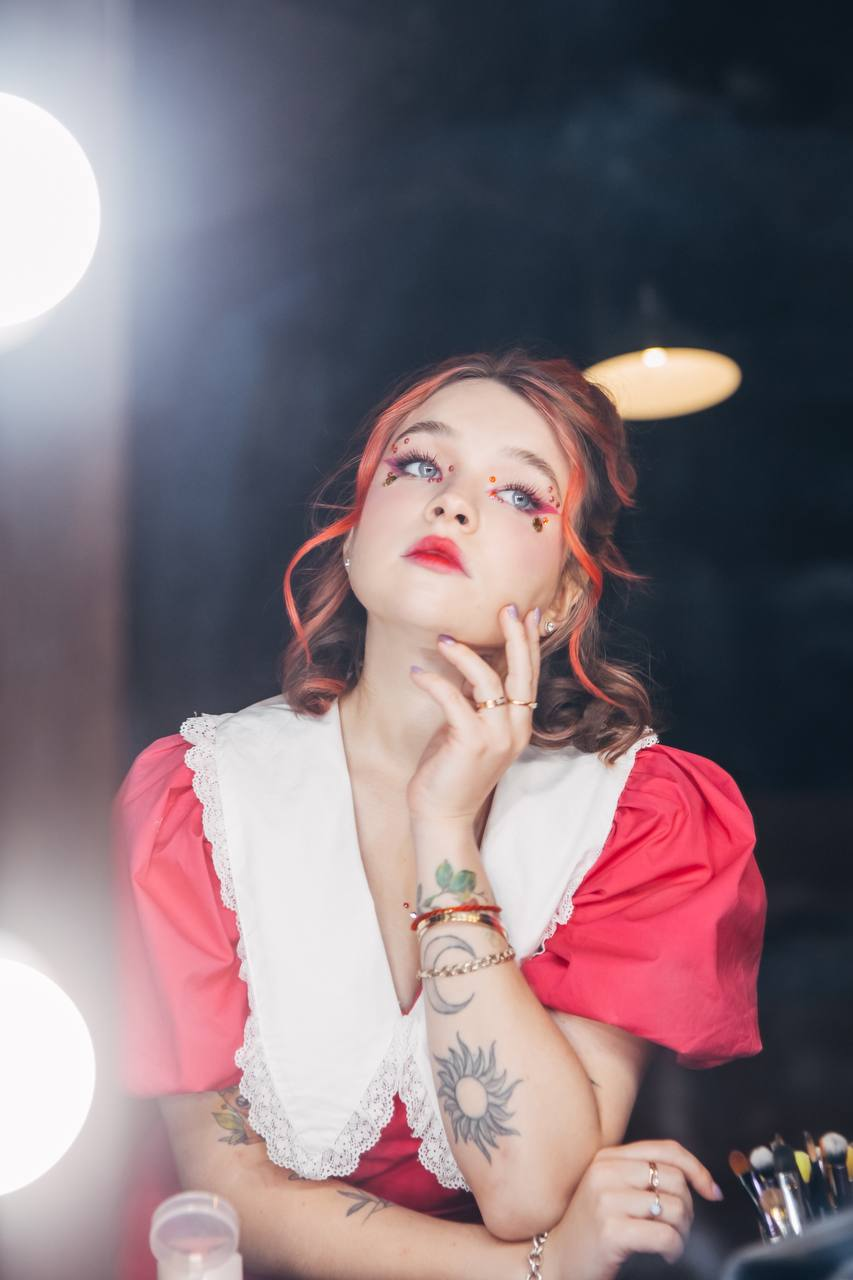
- Alyona Shvets in 2022

Background information
- Born: 12 March 2001 (age 25); Zlatoust, Chelyabinsk Oblast, Russia
- Instruments: Guitar, keyboard and ukulele
- Years active: 2015–present
- Website: alena-shvets.ru

Alyona Shvets (Russian: Алёна Сергеевна Швецова; born 12 March 2001) is a Russian singer, composer, guitarist, keyboardist and ukulele player.

== Biography ==
=== Early life ===
Alyona Shvetsova was born on March 12, 2001, in Zlatoust in Chelyabinsk Oblast, to a family of physicians and construction workers. At the age of three, her parents sent her to music school, but her parents postponed her singing education due to asthma. She started writing songs at 14. As a teenager, Shvetsova received her first guitar, and she started to perform songs on the streets of Chelyabinsk with her best friend. Her parents were the first to hear her original songs. They then persuaded her to make a recording and post it on social media.

=== 2018: Start of career ===
Shvetsova posted the first songs that she composed on VK, under the pseudonym "Alyona Shvets." In June 2018, she released her debut mini-album, "Crashing on the Balcony" (Вписка на балконе), which drew public attention to the young artist. The album "Bury Me for Society" (Похороните меня за социум) was released in October 2018, the album's name being a reference to the novel, Bury Me Behind the Baseboards (Похороните меня за плинтусом) by Pavel Sanaev. She started to gain popularity with her album "When Lilac Blooms" (Когда зацветёт сирень.) After its release in April 2018, she was recognized in Runet.

=== 2019—2021: Rise in popularity ===
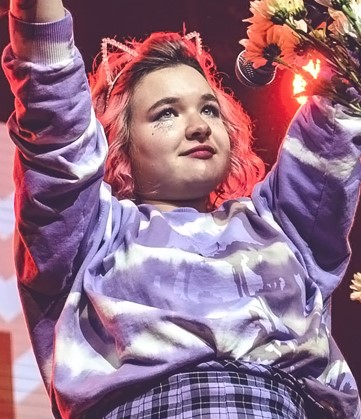
Shvets in 2020

Shvets released her third studio album, "Wire from Dandelions" (Проволока из одуванчиков), on September 6, 2019. On September 25th, she would perform Dandelion (Одуванчик) from that album on Evening Urgant.

In the summer of 2020, she released her fifth album "Queen of Sludge" (Королева отстоя) consisting of 10 tracks. The song, "Young Beautiful Trash" (Молодая красивая дрянь) was previously released as a single. Music videos were made for the songs "Killing Machine" (Машина для убийств) and "Young Beautiful Trash" (Молодая красивая дрянь)

In the spring of 2021 the mini album "Little One with a Guitar" (Мелкая с гитарой) was released with five tracks.

On July 15, 2021, in honor of the anniversary of Spotify in Russia, the streaming platform announced that Shvets took first place in the top 10 solo artists. Shvets' photo was on a skyscraper in Times Square as part of Spotify's "Equal" campaign to support women in the music industry.

In October Roskomnadzor asked the prosecutor's office to check Shvets' songs and YouTube channel. The allegations were dismissed.

On November 22 the mini album, "Pest" (Вредина) was released including three tracks: "Pest" (Вредина), "I Delete" (Удалю) and "Moon" (Луна.) One music video was filmed that included all three songs.

=== 2022–present ===
On March 11 2022 Shvets released two studio albums, "Poison" (Яд) and "Antidote" (Противоядие). The album "Poison" (Яд) has eight songs and the album "Antidote" (Противоядие) has 10 songs. On May 26 2022, a music video for the song "Fuck It" (Да похуй) was released. On June 10th, the advertising track and music video "Beauty Dacha" (Бьюти дача), recorded specifically for the promotional campaign of the cosmetic brand Beauty Bomb, was released. On July 1, Shvets performed her new single "Gerda" (Герда) in Gorky Park. "Gerda" (Герда) was officially released on July 15, along with a music video. Later, on 16 September 2022, the single "Disorder" (Расстройство) was released. On October 5 2022, a small cartoon was released with the song.

The collection "Old Songs" (Старые песни) was released November 4 2022 on Alyonа Shvets' channel. It was a collection of sixteen old songs that were collected from 2018 to 2020. On November 11 2022, the song "Forever 17" (Вечно 17) was released. A video with the same name was released on December 9, 2022.

== Musical style ==
Shvets considers her musical style post-bard with a mix of pop-rock, indie-pop and bard songs.

== Discography ==
Studio albums

- «У стены с картинками» (2017)
- «Август плачет» (2018)
- «Когда зацветёт сирень» (2018)
- «Похороните меня за социум» (2018)
- «Ведёрко с блевотиной» (2019)
- «Проволока из одуванчиков» (2019)
- «Королева отстоя» (2020)
- «Противоядие» (2022)
- «Яд» (2022)
- «Старые песни» (2022)

Mini albums

- «Вписка на балконе» (2018)
- «пока работает стиральная машина» (2019)
- «Мелкая с гитарой» (2021)
- «Вредина» (2021)
