= The Life of a Mountain Road Monkey =

2023 Taiwanese web video series

- Produced by: Eric Duan
- Distributed by: YouTube
- Release dates: 7 July 2023 (Part 1); 13 August 2023 (Part 2)
- Running time: 19 minutes (Part 1); 45 minutes (Part 2)
- Country: Taiwan (Republic of China)
- Languages: Mandarin; Taiwanese Hokkien

External videos
- Part 1 on YouTube
- Part 2 on YouTube

The Life of a Mountain Road Monkey (山道猴子的一生) is a long-form web series released on YouTube in two parts between July and August 2023 by Taiwanese creator Eric Duan. The video uses Wojak characters to depict its cast. The story follows a convenience store worker whose inflated vanity leads him to lose himself in a toxic relationship, resulting in social isolation and ultimately death in a mountain road racing accident. The series sparked widespread discussion online in Taiwan and became an internet meme.

== Plot ==
=== Part 1 ===
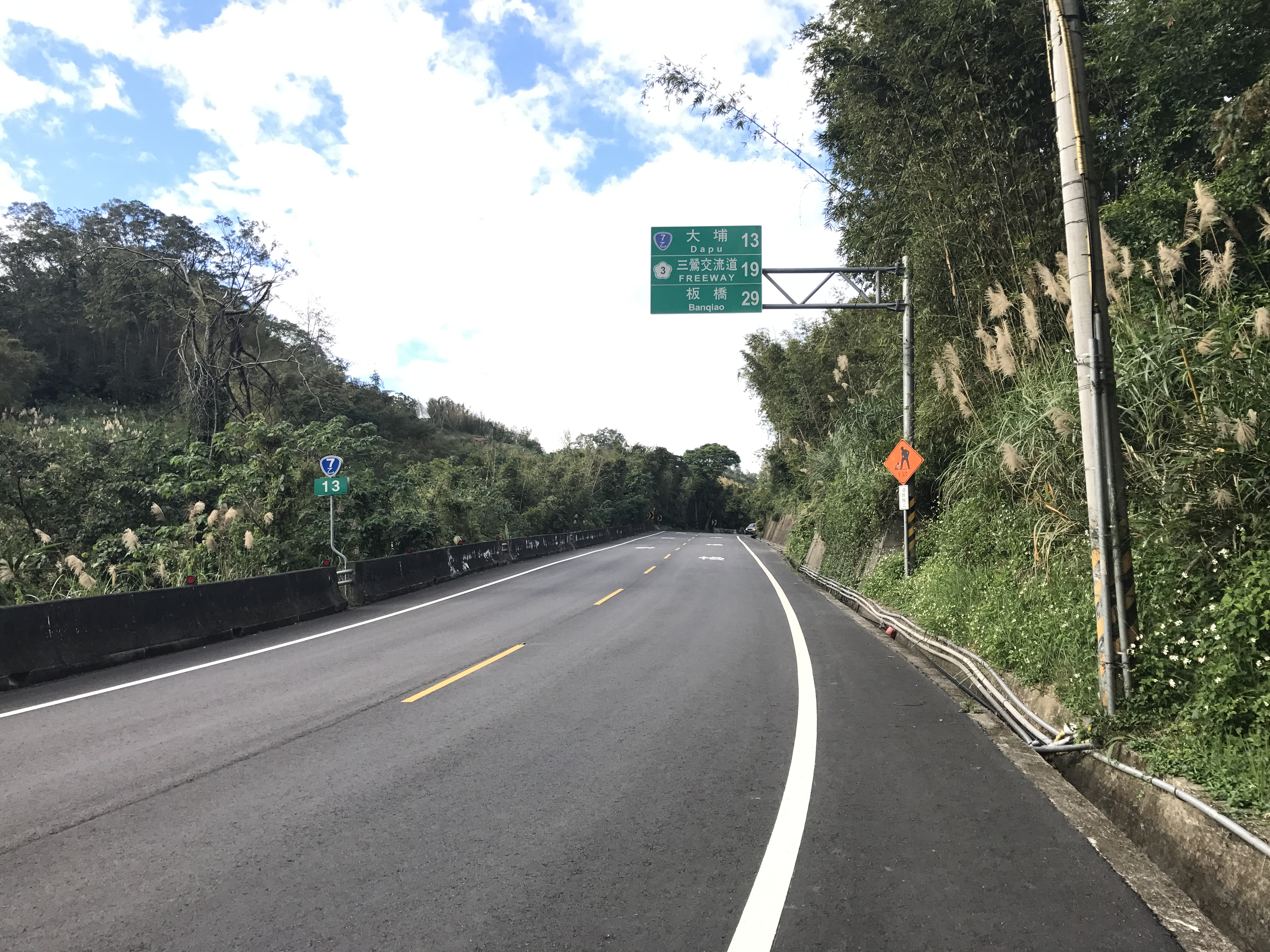
The story is set along Provincial Highway 7B (台7乙線), stretching from Sanxia District, New Taipei City to Daxi District, Taoyuan City, a key backdrop in the first episode (part 1).

The protagonist is a proud and self-centered young man working at a convenience store. He enjoys browsing social media and is obsessed with racing on mountain roads— not out of a love for motorcycles, but to feel superior to his peers. Ignoring the risks of aggressive marketing tactics and financial danger, he hastily buys a second-hand heavy motorcycle and invests heavily in modifications. This makes him the first among his friends to "upgrade" to a heavy bike, which dramatically boosts his social media following and further inflates his ego.

He is approached by an attractive woman who seduces him with sweet talk. Driven by vanity and infatuation, he quickly opens up to her and they become a couple. He showers her with financial support, funding her vehicle purchases and upgrades, despite his worsening finances. Blinded by emotion, he fails to see that she is promiscuous and treats him as nothing more than a walking ATM. In his desire for outward glamour, he neglects his inner needs. Eventually, his girlfriend finds a new partner and does not acknowledge what he had provided to her.

The episode ends with a quote from Marcus Aurelius, the Emperor of Rome:

The happiness of your life depends upon the quality of your thoughts.

=== Part 2 ===
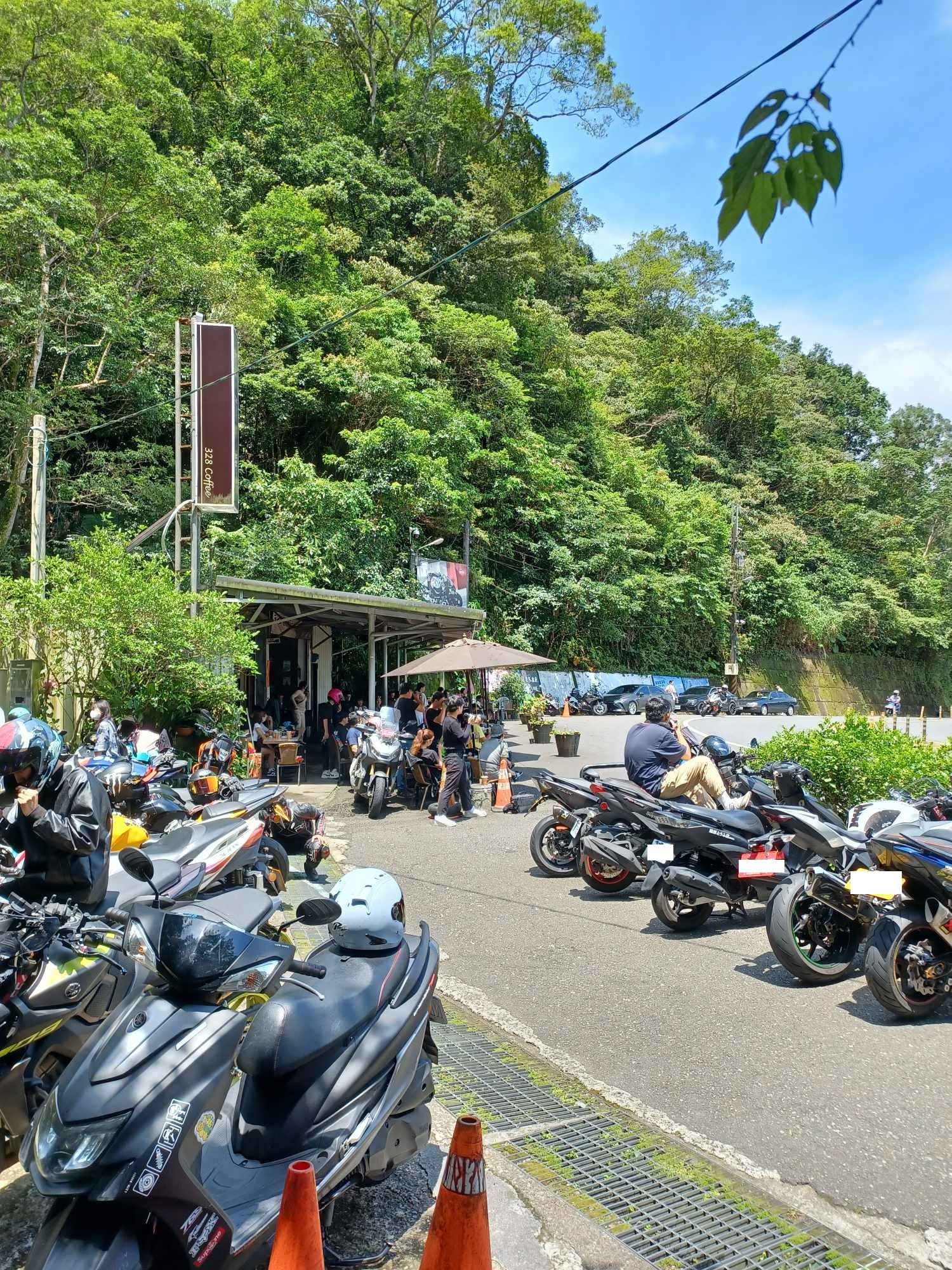
The story continues on the Beiyi Highway, the section of Provincial Highway 9 from Xindian District, New Taipei City to Toucheng, Yilan County. A coffee shop located at the 32.8 km mark of the Beiyi Highway is depicted as a key location in this episode.

Devastated by his ex-girlfriend's betrayal, the protagonist vents his anger by exposing her debts and flirtatious behavior in a motorcycle forum (二輪社團), hoping to humiliate her. Instead, his actions backfire: her rebuttal gains sympathy and support, while he becomes the target of ridicule. Though shaken, two friends remain by his side, advising him to always document loans properly and reminding him of his original passion for motorcycles.

Learning that a relative once lost money for the same reason (lending without a written agreement), and wanting to move on from the bitter experience of this break-up, he deletes his accusatory posts and decides to save up for a better motorcycle, hoping to attract a more ideal partner.

Still working at the convenience store, he meets a new part-time coworker—a university student and former online seller—through the store manager. They bond over a shared interest in motorcycles, and she admires him. Her compliments reignite his vanity. They become a couple, and he coaches her in social media strategy, which quickly boosts her follower count.

However, his previous emotional wounds resurface. Jealous and suspicious of the girl's male friends, he becomes increasingly paranoid, despite her reassurances. Meanwhile, his bike's engine suffers a major failure, revealing a previous owner's shoddy modifications. Friends advise him to cut his losses and switch to a simpler bike, but he refuses, worried about losing online popularity. He borrows money to cover repair costs.

His life unravels further, yet he remains fixated on internet fame. He tries to sell expensive merchandise to handle his growing debt. The girl, trying to help, suggests accepting an invitation from a photography group for a paid outdoor shoot. Since the shoot allows female participants to bring companions, she offers to share some of her earnings with him. This enrages him; he accuses her of undermining his dignity, insisting no man should depend on a woman financially.

Unable to endure his emotional abuse and suspicion, she breaks up with him and quits the convenience store. Even his longtime friends drift away after he shows indifference toward one of them being injured in a crash.

Ultimately, he challenges a stranger to a high-speed race in the mountains. His reckless maneuvers cause him to lose control and crash into an oncoming truck, killing him instantly. The crash footage is sensationalized by a livestreamer.

The episode ends with a quote from Seneca, the Ancient Roman philosopher:

We suffer more often in imagination than in reality

== Production ==
The A Life of a Mountain Road Monkey video series was created by Eric Duan. Set in contemporary Taiwan, the work delves deeply into a specific subculture centered on motorcycle enthusiasts and mountain road racing. The term "mountain road monkey" (山道猴子) refers to individuals who enjoy speeding on winding mountain roads, often using uniquely customized bikes to attract attention. They value motorcycle speed and freedom, but frequently disregard traffic laws when racing on mountain roads with heavy motorcycles. The series is filled with contemporary internet meme elements and presents the protagonist's tragic fate through a direct and unpretentious narrative style. Through sharp satire, it reveals the unfortunate consequences of embracing misguided values. However, Eric Duan clarified in the video description that the story is entirely fictional, with no basis in real events—characters, plotlines, and dialogues are all made up.

In addition to elements from the motorcycle community, such as manual transmission and modified bikes, the series also touches on a wide array of social issues through the protagonist's experiences. These include illegal lending, the working environment of convenience stores, low wages, the rise of internet celebrities, the influence of social media trends, emotional manipulation, infidelity, and the dynamics of friendship. These elements are explored in increasingly negative contexts to underscore their societal impact.

The main setting of the story is Provincial Highway 7B (Taiwan Route 7B), a crucial road connecting Sanxia District in New Taipei City with Daxi District in Taoyuan City. Known as a "mecca for mountain racers"(跑山聖地) due to its winding paths, it attracts youths, motorcycle clubs, and photography enthusiasts on weekends.Beiyi Highway, another popular road for motorcyclists, is also mentioned in the dialogue.

=== Style ===
Visually, The Life of a Mountain Road Monkey is heavily inspired by the Wojak comics meme that gained popularity online in 2019. These comics typically portray simple interactions among various Wojak characters. Unlike traditional animation, the series primarily uses character illustrations, static images, text messages, and dialogue boxes to convey the story. Wojak-style characters serve as the foundation for assigning specific traits and personalities to each figure.

The voiceover is generated using text-to-speech (TTS) technology. Mispronunciations caused by tonal errors—such as pronouncing "還錢" (repay) as "hái qián" instead of "huán qián"—have become a talking point among viewers.

== Reception ==
The series premiered on Eric Duan's YouTube channel, with the first episode reaching 2.1 million views within a month, and the second part amassing 2 million views in just three days.

The videos sparked intense online discussion, with audiences resonating with the storytelling and character portrayals. The protagonist, often referred to as a "young monkey," is seen as embodying the tragic flaw of prioritizing ego and pride over safety and reason—a depiction that has successfully stirred emotional responses among viewers. Beyond its narrative and script, the series has also been praised for highlighting broader social issues beyond just motorcycles or niche subcultures, and it has a profound warning meaning.

Lawyer Lü Qiuyuan (呂秋遠) commented that while some may not understand why the film went viral, everyone can see a part of themselves in it. "The mountain road monkey is a monkey only because the protagonist did every stupid thing without turning back at any point. We are lucky because we either woke up at a critical moment or had someone help us stop before it was too late."

Taiwanese media outlets extensively reported on the film. Yeh Chi-bin (葉啟斌, deputy director of Research at the Tri-Service General Hospital, emphasized that self-confidence should come from within, not from external validation. A veteran motorcycle mechanic advised that bike modifications should always prioritize safety and be done within one's means. In ''CommonWealth Magazine'', writer Lin Yun-hung (林運鴻) interpreted the protagonist's immersion in the motorcycle scene as symbolic of the socioeconomic stagnation faced by blue-collar youth. His hyper-individualism, desire to dominate others, and emotional exploitation reflect an inner emptiness that cannot be filled by social circles alone.The male protagonist's pursuit of dreams through extreme overwork represents the minimal freedom that low-income earners can afford, while his second girlfriend's failed online business venture and entry into gig work depict another facet of this bleak economic reality. The story also repeatedly portrays misogyny and the absence of trust or reciprocity in relationships among the working class.

Due to the protagonist's uniform resembling that of FamilyMart, the official FamilyMart Facebook page posted on August 17 clarifying, "We are FamilyMart, not FartingMart (the parody store name in the video)," also referencing the show's key phrase "Don’t forget your original intention."(莫忘初衷) The scene of the protagonist crashing on a mountain road prompted police to launch traffic safety campaigns, urging the public not to follow trends by racing in the mountains or challenge others out of pride, to prevent accidents.Authorities also stated they would step up patrols along the route.

The livestreamer character at the end of the video was modeled after "Kangkang Talks Bikes"(康康嘴機車). Kangkang (康康)praised the accuracy of the portrayal and commended the overall production quality.

The video also gained traction in China after being reposted to Bilibili, garnering nearly 70,000 views. However, the protagonist's shirt was censored, allegedly due to the number "1989.6.4" appearing beneath the phrase "Don’t forget your original intention,"(莫忘初衷) which was interpreted as referencing the Tiananmen Square Massacre—a politically sensitive topic in China. As a result, the content was subject to censorship, commonly referred to as being "harmonized."

=== Popularity ===
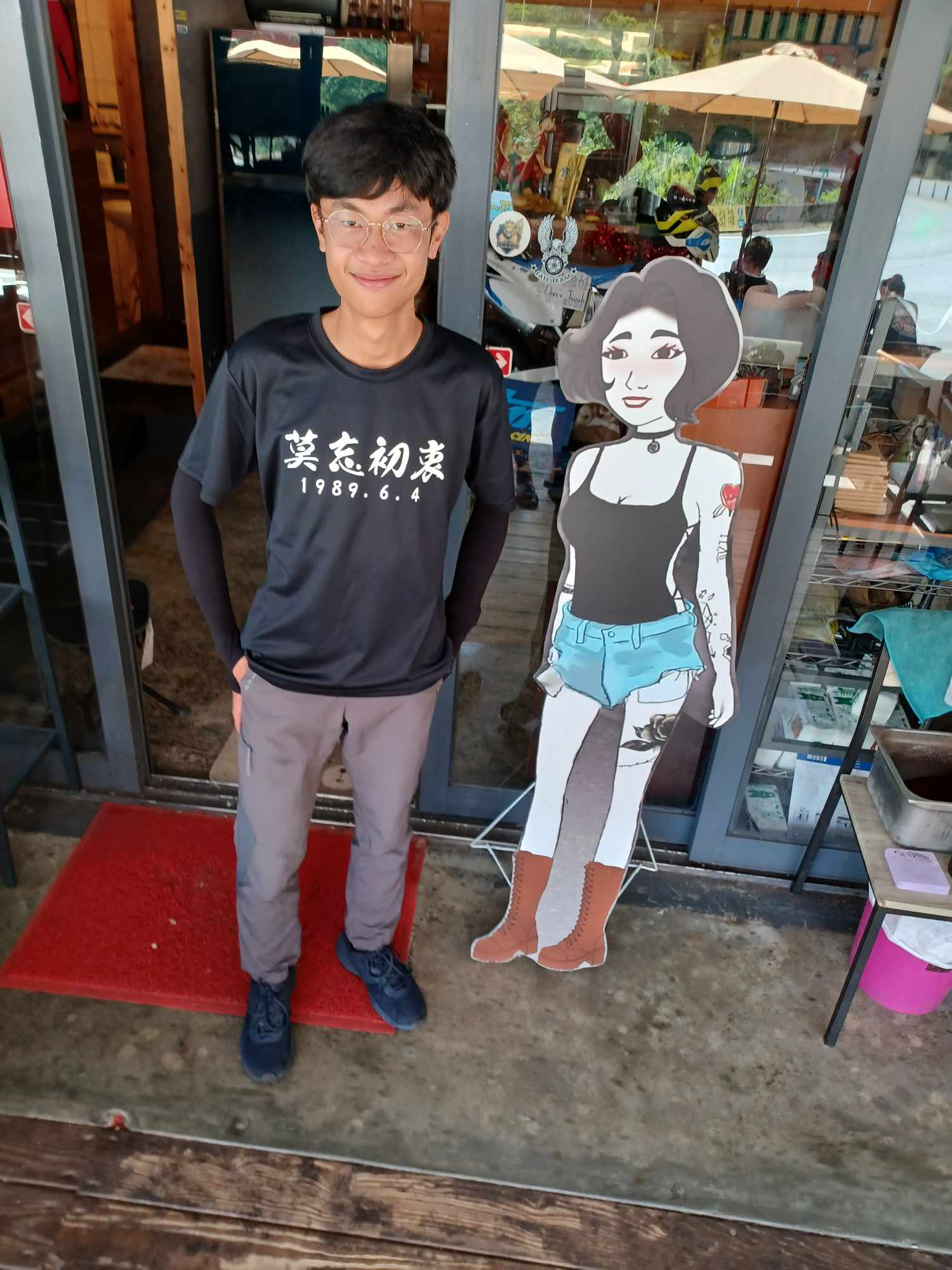
A man cosplayed as the video's protagonist, accompanied by a life-size standee of the female lead.

After its release, the video spurred a wave of fan creations and cosplay. Eric Duan issued a statement clarifying that he only manages the YouTube channel. All other character accounts on platforms like Instagram, Facebook, and X (Twitter) were created by fans or third parties—he did not participate or provide any image assets.

== See also ==
- Money worship
- MrMarmot
