= BSAS =

BSAS may refer to:

- Bachelor of Science in Architectural Studies
- Bergen Shopping Addiction Scale
- Bosley-Salih-Alorainy syndrome
- British Social Attitudes Survey
- British Society of Animal Science
- Buenos Aires (Bs. As.)
