= Association of Psychological and Social Studies =

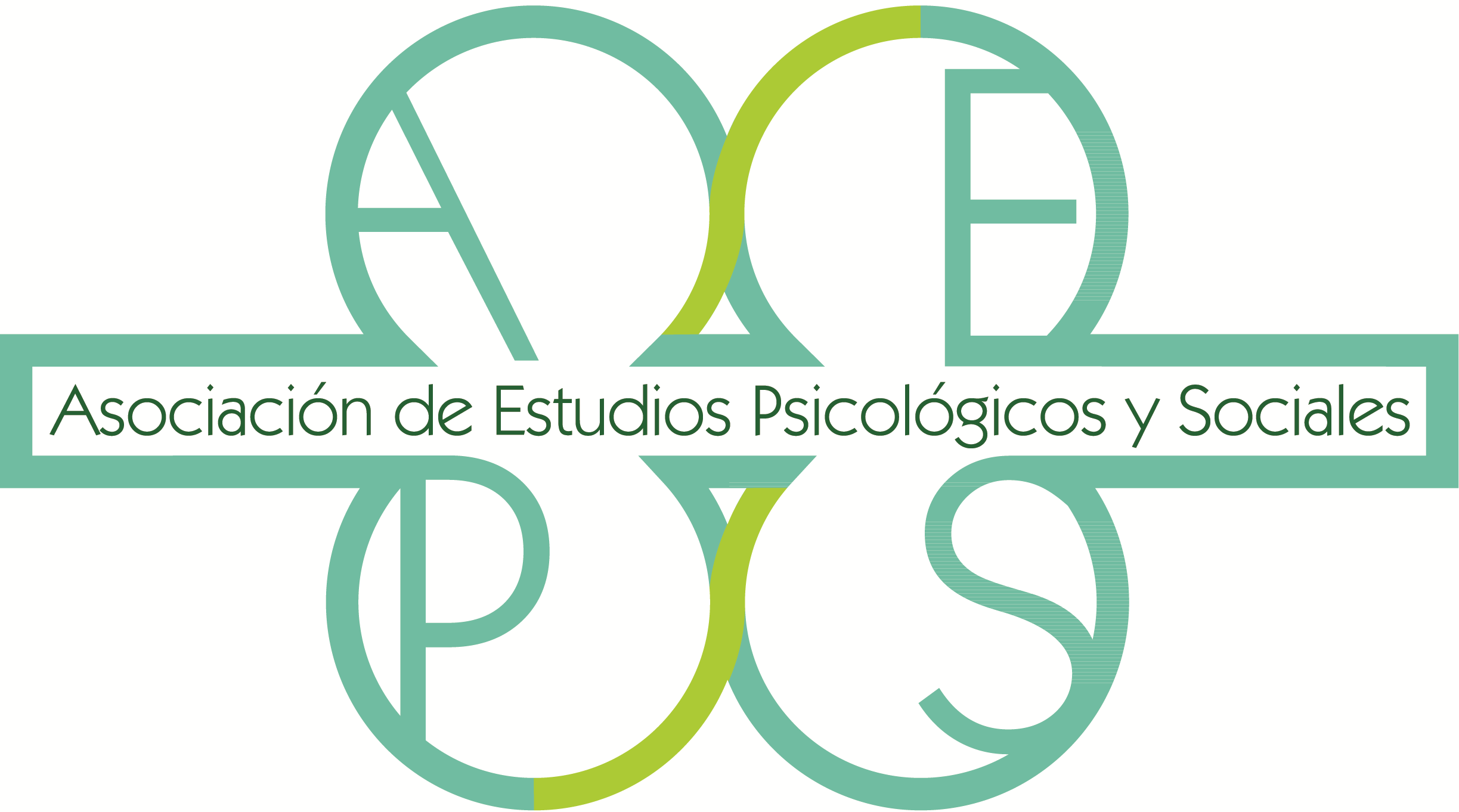
- Logo of the Association of Psychological and Social Studies
- Formation: 1986
- Type: NGO
- Purpose: Promotion of the study and scientific research of social sciences and human behavior
- Headquarters: Zaragoza (Spain)
- President: Javier Garcés Prieto
- Website: www.psicosociales.com

The Association of Psychological and Social Studies (Spanish: Asociación de estudios psicológicos y sociales) is a learned society, which was founded 9 January 1998 by a group of researchers, teachers, and professionals related to the social sciences, psychology, pedagogy, medicine, and law. The association has its head office in Zaragoza (Spain). The president is Javier Garcés Prieto (2016).

== Aims ==
The main objectives of the association are:

- Promoting the study and scientific research of social sciences and human behavior
- Carrying out projects to improve the individual quality of life and social development
- Stimulate research and projects related to health, understood as physical, mental, and social welfare
- Organizing educational and informative programs, nationally and internationally, to make advances in psychology, sociology, health, and legal science available to the society at large
- Collaborating with other public and private institutions in favor of individual welfare improvement, social progress, and social integration of neglected collectives

== Activities ==
Some of the most important activities of the society are or have been the following:

- Studies of psychological and social problems of modern society, carried out by association researchers on consumerism, shopping addiction, and the excessive or inappropriate use of new technology.
- Consumer behavior and new models of development to make economic progress compatible with ethical and sustainable consuming.
- Promoting active and critical consumer's movement as well as adult and young citizens education as responsible consumers.
- Studying and spreading the scientific psychology aspects useful to the daily life of citizens. The more relevant projects in these fields have been those related to non-pharmacological alternatives to stress and anxiety problems, psychological welfare, mental health, and rational use of psychoactive medicines.
- Psychology of sport and physical activity, with the starting-up, in 2008, of a group of professionals and researchers in this field, led by Miguel Angel Ramos.

== Organization ==
The association is organized in six sections: psychology, sociology, education, consuming, health, and citizen participation.

An independent study concluded that the association is among the more outstanding Spanish entities as well as one of the most efficiently run.
