= Money, A Mythology of Darkness =

Money, a Mythology of Darkness
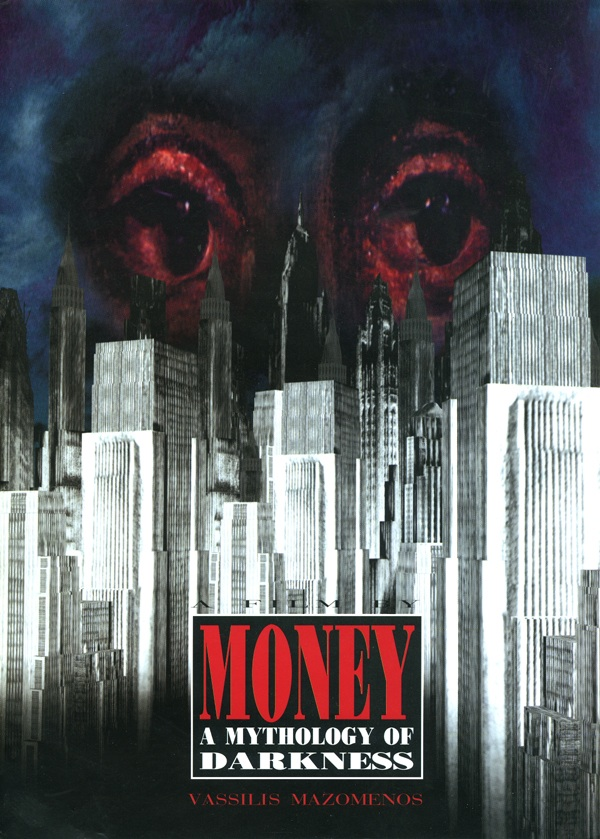
- Official Poster
- Το χρήμα - μια μυθολογία του σκότους (Romanization: To hrima - Mia mythologia tou Skotous)
- Directed by: Vassilis Mazomenos
- Written by: Vasilis Mazomenos
- Produced by: Yiannis Koutsomitis; Vasilis Mazomenos; Myron Papoutsakis (Co-producer)
- Narrated by: Yorgos Karamihos (credited as Giorgos Karamihos); Efi Theodorou
- Edited by: Petros Augerinos
- Animation by: Antonis Doussias (Animation director, credited as Antonis Dousias); Stelios Pappas; Vangelis Zouboulis
- Layouts by: Alexander Hemery CG Artist
- Production companies: Greek Film Centre; Horme Pictures; Oionos
- Distributed by: Horme Pictures All Media: WW: 1998
- Release date: 17 November 1998 (Greece)
- Running time: 70 minutes
- Country: Greece
- Language: Greek

Money, A Mythology of Darkness (Greek: Το χρήμα - Μια μυθολογία του Σκότους) is a 1998 feature Greek film directed by the Greek director, writer and producer Vassilis Mazomenos. The film is the first European 3D animation feature film and deals with the influence of wealth on humanity. In 2015, The Hindu's film critic, Naman Ramachandran, called it "[t]he Greek film that is most relevant today..."

== Synopsis ==
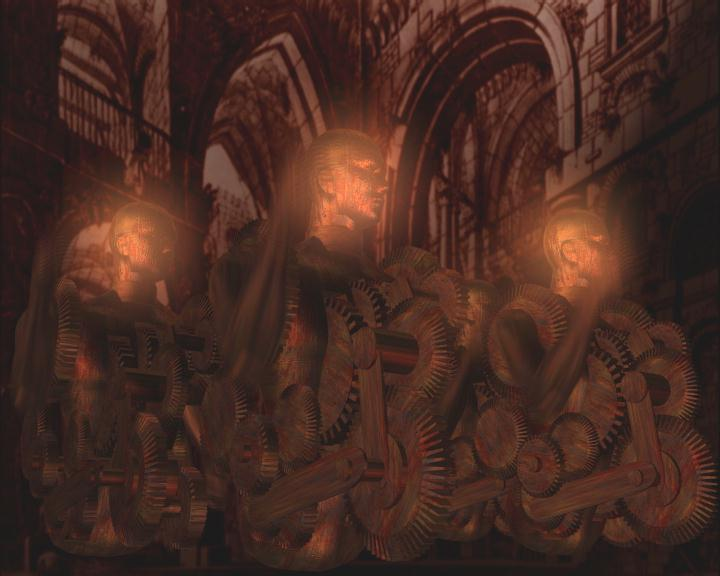
A scene from the first European 3D animation feature, "Money, a mythology of Darkness" .

A Christ-like figure explores the degeneration of society caused by the cult of wealth.

== Background ==
It was the first European feature 3D animation film. This was Mazomenos' third feature film, however he had previously worked with computer-generated images in The Triumph of Time, although these were two-dimensional.

== Reception ==
Vrasidas Karalis wrote in A History of Greek Cinema:

Vassilis Mazomenos released his mesmerizing and terrifying apocalyptic phantasmagoria Money—A mythology of Darkness (Hrima, mia mythologia tou skotous) in 1998. A visual essay on the impact of money on humanity, it is a film that deserves more attention and which proves the potential of new technologies in the creation of a new kind of cinematic language. With this film, Mazomenos created a trilogy of philosophical essays by means of visual experimentations.

— Vrasidas Karalis, A History of Greek Cinema, p. 257.

Part of the film trilogy about the end of the West, that was presented and awarded in the 2001 retrospective in Fantasporto.

== Awards ==
1998: Greek State Film Awards (Second Prize for Documentary or Animated Film Awarded to Animated Film) - Won

1999: European Fantasy Award (George Melies Award) - Nominated

1999: Fantasporto Special Jury Award - Co-winner - Won
