= Psychophysiological economics =

Study of psychological and physiological events as factors in consumer economic behavior

Psychophysiological economics is a field of study focused on the assessment and evaluation of psychological and physiological events as factors shaping consumer economic behavior. Psychophysiological economists believe that behavior and cognitive processing are indivisible and that behavioral, cognitive, and physiological tools and techniques can be combined to create interventions that improve the economic well-being of consumers.

Psychophysiological economics differs from behavioral economics by focusing on direct measures of physiological change and observational data, in addition to attitudinal measurement. Psychophysiological economics also differs from functional magnetic resonance imaging, which is typically applied exclusively to the study of brain activity. Psychophysiological economics emphasizes the role of the peripheral nervous system as it relates to shaping economic behavior.

The peripheral nervous system includes the spinal and cranial nerves. Of specific relevance is the Autonomic Nervous System (ANS). The ANS regulates glands and other internal organs (visceral structures). Visceral structures control involuntary physiological activities and behavior. ANS increases electrodermal activity (EDA) and electrocardiogram activity (ECG), this phenomenon is also referred to as physiological arousal. Psychophysiological economics researchers directly measure the sympathetic nervous system as a person responds to stressor within the environment.

== Assumptions ==
Three assumptions provide the basis for psychophysiological economics studies. First, stress shapes how consumers react, both physically and mentally, to economic challenges (i.e., stressors). Second, stress cannot be evaluated and assessed easily using traditional observational methods. Third, both eustress (positive stress) and distress (negative stress) can alter behavior by causing changes in a person's visceral structures. These changes occur involuntarily, but the underlying cause can be measured and evaluated.

== Scope ==
As a new field of study, psychophysiological economics tends to be focused on evaluating and assessing physiological aspects of economic behavior. Clinical and experimental research uses the following tools to evaluate stress responses:

- Cardiovascular activity: heart rate variability
- Electrodermal activity: skin conductance
- Peripheral skin temperature: sympathetic activation (sympathetic nervous system)
- Respiratory feedback: breathing patterns
- Surface electromyography: muscle tension patterns (muscle tone)
- Sweat production
- Elevated blood pressure

These tools allow Psychophysiological Economics researchers to evaluate directly, in real time, the relationship between cognition and economic behavior. In general, someone experiencing economic stress (either acute or chronic) should exhibit the following characteristics as they relate to any given economic stressor: (a) muscle tension, (b) increased sweat production, (c) a decrease in peripheral skin temperature, (d) increased breathing, and (e) increased heart rate variability. For those who are experiencing economic stress, specific interventions can be used to reduce such stress. A good source of papers on the topic can be found in the Journal of Financial Therapy.

== Impacts of psychophysiological stress on consumer behavior ==
Stress may impact a consumers willingness to take part in financial services such as financial planning. However, the impacts of psychological stress, both positive and negative, on healthy consumer behavior are a source of debate.

The impact of stressors may lead to different psychophysiological and coping behaviors. One coping strategy with potential positive benefits is exposure as a mediator. When exposed to negative financial outcomes, the investor may feel stimulated to continue learning. However, when exposed to too many negative financial outcomes, the investor may disengage from the learning process. Moreover, lower levels psychophysiological stress are shown to increase a consumer's willingness to make financial changes, specifically with self imposed goals. As such, some levels of physiological stress may benefit the decision making processes, but there may be a threshold as to how much stress is beneficial to descion making behavior.

Greater psychophysiological stress has also been associated with greater levels of risk taking behavior. In one study, researcher found that equity traders that have heightened stress as measured by psychophysiological indicators, were associated with greater market volatility- regardless of experience. This may indicate that psychophysiological stress is not only linked to cognitive input, but that it can also influence consumer behavior.

== See also ==
- Money disorders
