= Infidelity =

Cheating, adultery, or having an affair

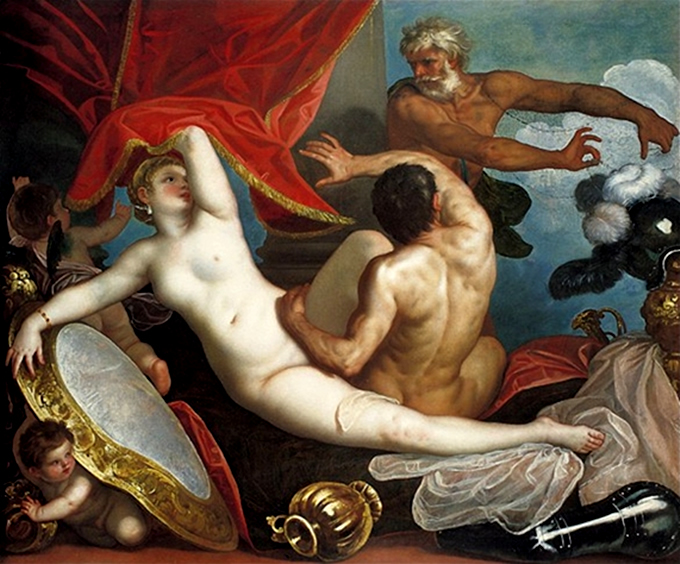
Venus and Mars Surprised by Vulcan, by Alessandro Varotari. In ancient Roman religion, Vulcan discovers his wife, Venus, having an affair with Mars.

Infidelity (synonyms include cheating, having an affair, adultery, being unfaithful, non-consensual non-monogamy, straying or two-timing) is a violation of a couple's emotional or sexual exclusivity that commonly results in feelings of anger, sexual jealousy, and rivalry.

What constitutes infidelity depends on expectations within the relationship. In marital relationships, exclusivity is commonly assumed. Infidelity can cause psychological damage, including feelings of rage and betrayal, depression, low sexual and personal confidence, and even post-traumatic stress disorder. People of both sexes can experience social consequences if their act of infidelity becomes public, but the form and extent of these consequences can depend on the gender of the unfaithful person.

== Incidence ==
After the Kinsey Reports came out in the early 1950s, findings suggested that historically and cross-culturally, extramarital sex has been a matter of regulation more than sex before marriage. The Kinsey Reports found that around half of men and a quarter of women studied had committed adultery. The Janus Report on Sexual Behavior in America also reported that one-third of married men and a quarter of women have had an extramarital affair.

According to The New York Times, the most consistent data on infidelity comes from the University of Chicago's General Social Survey (GSS). Interviews with people in monogamous relationships since 1972 by the GSS have shown that approximately 12% of men and 7% of women admit to having had an extramarital relationship. Results, however, vary year by year, and also by age-group surveyed. For example, one study conducted by the University of Washington, Seattle, found slightly, or significantly higher, rates of infidelity for populations under 35, or older than 60. In that study, which involved 19,065 people during a 15-year period, rates of infidelity among men were found to have risen from 20% to 28%, and rates for women ranged from 5% to 15%. In more recent nationwide surveys, several researchers found that about twice as many men as women reported having an extramarital affair. A survey conducted in 1990 found that 2.2% of married participants reported having more than one partner during the past year. In general, national surveys conducted in the early 1990s reported that between 15 and 25% of married Americans reported having extramarital affairs. People who had stronger sexual interests, more permissive sexual values, lower subjective satisfaction with their partner, weaker network ties to their partner, and greater sexual opportunities were more likely to be unfaithful.

Rates of infidelity among women are thought to increase with age. In one study, rates were higher in more recent marriages, compared with previous generations. Men were found to be only "somewhat" more likely than women to engage in infidelity, with rates for both sexes becoming increasingly similar. Another study found that the likelihood of women being involved in infidelity reached a peak in the seventh year of their marriage and then declined afterward. For married men, the longer they were in relationships, the less likely they were to engage in infidelity, until the eighteenth year of marriage, at which point the chance of men engaging in infidelity began to increase.

Research on pregnancy and its effects on sexual desire and rates of infidelity conducted in southern Spain indicated that men were more likely to engage in infidelity while their partner was pregnant. It was estimated that 1 in 10 fathers-to-be engaged in infidelity at some point during their partner's pregnancy and suggested that the likelihood of the man engaging in infidelity increases as the woman's pregnancy progresses through its trimesters.

One measure of infidelity is paternal discrepancy, a situation that arises when someone who is presumed to be a child's father is in fact not the biological parent. Frequencies as high as 30% are sometimes assumed in the media, but research by sociologist Michael Gilding traced these overestimates back to an informal remark at a 1972 conference. The detection of paternal discrepancy can occur in the context of medical genetic screening, in genetic family name research, and in immigration testing. Such studies show that paternal discrepancy is, in fact, less than 10% among the sampled African populations, less than 5% among the sampled Native American and Polynesian populations, less than 2% of the sampled Middle Eastern population, and generally 1–2% among European samples.

=== Gender ===
Differences in sexual infidelity as a function of gender have been commonly reported. The National Health and Social Life Survey found that 4% of married men, 16% of cohabiting men, and 37% of dating men engaged in acts of sexual infidelity in the previous year compared to 1% of married women, 8% of cohabiting women, and 17% of women in dating relationships. These differences have been generally thought due to evolutionary pressures that motivate men towards sexual opportunity and women towards commitment to one partner (for reasons such as reproductive success, stability, and social expectations). In addition, recent research finds that differences in gender may possibly be explained by other mechanisms including power and sensations seeking. For example, one study found that women in more financially independent and higher positions of power, were also more likely to be more unfaithful to their partners. In another study, when the tendency to sensation seek (i.e., engage in risky behaviours) was controlled for, there were no gender differences in the likelihood to being unfaithful. These findings suggest there may be various factors that might influence the likelihood of some individuals to engage in extradyadic relationships, and that such factors may account for observed gender differences beyond actual gender and evolutionary pressures associated with each.

==== Gender differences ====
There is currently debate in the field of evolutionary psychology whether an innate, evolved sex difference exists between men and women in response to an act of infidelity. A study published in 2002 suggested there may be sex differences in jealousy. Those that posit a sex difference exists state that men are 60% more likely to be disturbed by an act of sexual infidelity (having one's partner engage in sexual relations with another), whereas women are 83% more likely to be disturbed by an act of emotional infidelity (having one's partner fall in love with another). Those against this model argue that there is no difference between men and women in their response to an act of infidelity. From an evolutionary perspective, men are theorized to maximize their fitness by investing as little as possible in their offspring and producing as many offspring as possible, due to the risk of males investing in children that are not theirs. Women, who do not face the risk of cuckoldry, are theorized to maximize their fitness by investing as much as possible in their offspring because they invest at least nine months of resources towards their offspring in pregnancy. Maximizing female fitness is theorized to require males in the relationship to invest all their resources in the offspring. These conflicting strategies are theorized to have resulted in selection of different jealousy mechanisms that are designed to enhance the fitness of the respective gender.

A common way to test whether an innate jealousy response exists between sexes is to use a forced-choice questionnaire. This style of questionnaire asks participants "yes or no" and "response A or response B" style questions about certain scenarios. For example, a question might ask, "If you found your partner cheating on you would you be more upset by (A) the sexual involvement or (B) the emotional involvement". Many studies using forced choice questionnaires have found statistically significant results supporting an innate sex difference between men and women. Furthermore, studies have shown that this observation holds across many cultures, although the magnitudes of the sex difference vary within sexes across cultures.

Although forced-choice questionnaires show a statistically significant sex-difference, critics of the theory of evolved sex differences in jealousy question these findings. In consideration of the entire body of work on sex differences, C. F. Harris asserted that when methods other than forced-choice questionnaires are used to identify an innate sex difference, inconsistencies between studies begin to arise. For example, researchers found that women sometimes report feeling more intense jealousy in response to both sexual and emotional infidelity. The results of these studies also depended on the context in which the participants were made to describe what type of jealousy they felt, as well as the intensity of their jealousy.

In her meta-analysis, Harris raises the question of whether forced choice questionnaires actually measure what they purport: jealousy itself and evidence that differences in jealousy arise from innate mechanisms. Her meta-analysis reveals that sex-differences are almost exclusively found in forced-choice studies. According to Harris, a meta-analysis of multiple types of studies should indicate a convergence of evidence and multiple operationalizations. This is not the case, which raises the question as to the validity of forced-choice studies. DeSteno and Bartlett (2002) further support this argument by providing evidence which indicates that significant results of forced-choice studies may actually be an artifact of measurement; this finding would invalidate many of the claims made by those "in favor" of an "innate" sex difference. Even those "in favor" of sex-differences admit that certain lines of research, such as homicide studies, suggest against the possibility of sex-differences.

These inconsistent results have led researchers to propose novel theories that attempt to explain the sex differences observed in certain studies. One theory that has been hypothesized to explain why men and women both report more distress to emotional infidelity than sexual infidelity is borrowed from childhood attachment theories. Studies have found that attachment styles of adults are consistent with their self-reported relationship histories. For example, more men are reported to have an insecure, dismissing avoidant attachment style; where these "individuals often attempt to minimize or constrict emotional experience, deny needs for intimacy, are highly invested in autonomy, and are more sexually promiscuous than individuals who have other attachment styles". Levy and Kelly (2010) tested this theory and found that adult attachment styles strongly correlate to which type of infidelity elicited more jealousy. Individuals who have secure attachment styles often report that emotional infidelity is more upsetting whereas dismissing attachment styles were more likely to find sexual infidelity more upsetting. Their study did report that men in general were more likely than women to report sexual infidelity as more distressing, however this could be related to more men having a dismissing attachment style. The authors propose that a social mechanism may be responsible for these results. Similar studies focusing on the masculinization and feminization by society also argue for a social explanation, while discounting an evolutionary explanation.

A 2015 study found a correlation between AVPR1A expression and predisposition to extrapair mating in women but not in men.

=== Sexual orientation ===
Evolutionary researchers have suggested that humans have innate mechanisms that contribute to why they become sexually jealous, this is especially true for certain types of infidelity. It has been hypothesized that heterosexual men have developed an innate psychological mechanism that responds to the threat of sexual infidelity more than emotional infidelity, and vice versa for heterosexual women because potential cuckoldry is more detrimental to the male, who could potentially invest in offspring of another male, while for females emotional infidelity is more worrisome because they could lose the parental investment to another woman's offspring, therefore affecting their chances of survival. However, more recent studies suggest that increasingly both men and women would find emotional infidelity psychologically worse.

Symons (1979) determined that sexual jealousy is the major reason that many homosexual men are unsuccessful in maintaining monogamous relationships and suggests that all men are innately disposed to want sexual variation, with the difference between heterosexual and homosexual men being that homosexual men can find willing partners more often for casual sex, and thus satisfy this innate desire for sexual variety. However, according to this view, all men can be "hard wired" to be sexually jealous, and therefore gay men could be more upset by sexual infidelity than by emotional infidelity, and that lesbians could be more upset by emotional infidelity than sexual. Recent studies suggest that it may not be an innate mechanism but rather may depend on the importance placed on sexual exclusivity. Peplau and Cochran (1983) found that sexual exclusivity was much more important to heterosexual men and women compared to homosexual men and women. This theory suggests that it is not sexuality that may lead to differences but that people are prone to jealousy in domains that are especially important to them. Barah and Lipton argue that heterosexual couples may cheat just as much as homosexual relationships.

Harris (2002) tested these hypotheses among 210 individuals: 48 homosexual women, 50 homosexual men, 40 heterosexual women, and 49 heterosexual men. Results found that more heterosexual than homosexual individuals picked sexual infidelity as worse than emotional infidelity, with heterosexual men being the highest, and that when forced to choose, gay men overwhelmingly predicted emotional infidelity would be more troubling than sexual infidelity. These findings contradict Symons (1979) suggestion that there would be no gender difference in predicted responses to infidelity by sexual orientation. Blow and Bartlett (2005) suggest that even though sex outside of a homosexual relationship might be seen as more acceptable in some relationships, the consequences of infidelity do not occur without pain or jealousy.

Heterosexuals rated emotional and sexual infidelity as more emotionally distressing than did lesbian and gay individuals. Sex and sexual orientation differences emerged regarding the degree to which specific emotions were reported in response to sexual and emotional infidelity. Few researchers have explored the influence of sexual orientation on which type of infidelity is viewed as more distressing.

Summarizing the findings from these studies, heterosexual men seem to be more distressed by sexual infidelity than heterosexual women, lesbian women, and gay men. These latter three groups seem more responsible for this difference by reporting similarly higher levels of distress toward emotional infidelity than heterosexual men. However, within-sex analyses reveal that heterosexual men tend to rate emotional infidelity as more distressing than sexual infidelity.

== Responses ==
Some studies suggest that only a small percentage of couples that experience infidelity actually improve their relationship, whereas others report couples having surprisingly positive relationship outcomes. In terms of negative responses to infidelity, Charney and Parnass (1995) report that after hearing of a partner's infidelity, reactions have included rage and increased aggressiveness, loss of trust, decreased personal and sexual confidence, sadness, depression, damaged self-esteem, fear of abandonment, and a surge of justification to leave their partner. Another study reported that nearly 60% of the partners that were cheated on had emotional problems and depression following disclosure of the affair. Other negative consequences have included damage to relationships with children, parents, and friends, as well as legal consequences. A report in 1983 detailed that of a sample of 205 divorced individuals, about one half said their marital problems were caused by their spouse's infidelity.

The negative impact of infidelity on a relationship depends on how involved partners are in their infidelity relationship, and researchers maintain that infidelity itself does not cause divorce but the overall level of relationship satisfaction, motives for infidelity, level of conflict, and attitudes held about infidelity do. In fact, Schneider, et al. (1999) reported that even though 60% of their participants initially threatened to leave their primary relationship, a threat to leave due to infidelity did not actually predict the eventual outcome. Atkins, Eldridge, Baucom, and Christiansen found that couples who went through therapy as well as openly dealt with the infidelity were able to change at a faster rate than distressed couples who were just in therapy. Some unintended positive outcomes that have been reported for couples experiencing infidelity include closer marital relationships, increased assertiveness, taking better care of oneself, placing higher value on family, and realizing the importance of marital communication.

If divorce results from infidelity, research suggest that the faithful spouse may experience feelings of low life satisfaction and self-esteem; they may also engage in future relationships fearful of the same incidence occurring. Sweeney and Horwitz (2001) found that individuals who initiated a divorce after hearing about their partner's infidelity experienced less depression; however, the opposite was true when the offending spouse initiated divorce.

According to attachment theory, intimates evaluate the availability of close others and respond to them accordingly. While those with a secure attachment style believe others are available to them, those with insecure attachment believe others are less available to them. People who develop high levels of attachment have more anxiety and uncertainty. They cope by seeking reassurance and clinging themselves to another person. In attachment theory, people seek sex to help meet their needs. Those whose partners are unfaithful may experience anxiety, stress and depression. They are more likely to engage in activities that are risky to their health. Women who experienced negative appraisals, like self-blame and causal attribution, led to emotional distress and increased health-compromising behavior.

Gender self-esteem greatly affects infidelity. Different factors for the two genders are known to influence jealousy. Heterosexual men seem to be more distressed by sexual infidelity than heterosexual women, lesbian women, and gay men. The latter three groups seem more responsible for the difference by reporting similarly higher levels of distress toward emotional infidelity than heterosexual men.

== Causes ==
Studies have found that men are more likely to engage in extramarital sex if they are unsatisfied sexually, while women are more likely to engage in extramarital sex if they are unsatisfied emotionally. Kimmel and Van Der Veen found that sexual satisfaction may be more important to husbands and that wives are more concerned with compatibility with their partners. Studies suggest that individuals who can separate concepts of sex and love are more likely to accept situations where infidelity occurs. One study done by Roscoe, Cavanaugh, and Kennedy found that women indicated relationship dissatisfaction as the number one reason for infidelity, whereas men reported a lack of communication, understanding, and sexual incompatibility. Glass and Wright also found that men and women who are involved in both sexual and emotional infidelities reported being the most dissatisfied in their relationships than those who engaged in either sexual or emotional infidelity alone. In general, marital dissatisfaction overall is the number one reason often reported for infidelity for both sexes. There are many other factors that increase the likelihood of anyone engaging in infidelity. Individuals exhibiting sexually permissive attitudes and those who have had a high number of past sexual relationships are also more likely to engage in infidelity. Other factors such as being well educated, living in an urban centre, being less religious, having a liberal ideology and values, having more opportunities to meet potential partners, and being older affected the likelihood of one being involved in an extramarital affair.

=== Anthropological viewpoint ===
Anthropologists tend to believe humans are neither completely monogamous nor completely polygamous. Anthropologist Bobbi Low says we are "slightly polygamous", while Deborah Blum believes we are "ambiguously monogamous", and slowly moving away from the polygamous habits of our evolutionary ancestors.

According to anthropologist Helen Fisher, there are numerous psychological reasons for adultery. Some people may want to supplement a marriage, solve a sex problem, gather more attention, seek revenge, or have more excitement in the marriage. But based on Fisher's research, there also is a biological side to adultery. "We have two brain systems: one of them is linked to attachment and romantic love, and then there is the other brain system, which is purely sex drive." Sometimes these two brain systems are not well-connected, which enables people to become adulterers and satisfy their libido without any regards to their attachment side.

=== Cultural variation ===
Often, gender differences in both jealousy and infidelity are attributable to cultural factors. This variation stems from the fact that societies differ in how they view extramarital affairs and jealousy. An examination of jealousy across seven nations revealed that each partner in a relationship serves as each other's primary and exclusive source of satisfaction and attention in all cultures. Therefore, when an individual feels jealousy towards another, it is usually because they are now sharing their primary source of attention and satisfaction. However, variation can be seen when identifying the behaviors and actions that betray the role of primary attention (satisfaction) giver. For instance, in certain cultures if an individual goes out with another of the opposite gender, emotions of intense jealousy can result; however, in other cultures, this behavior is perfectly acceptable and is not given much thought.

While many cultures report infidelity as wrong and admonish it, some are more tolerant of such behaviour. These views are generally linked to the overall liberal nature of the society. For instance, Danish society is viewed as more liberal than many other cultures, and as such, have correlating liberal views on infidelity and extramarital affairs. According to Christine Harris and Nicholas Christenfeld, societies that are legally more liberal against extramarital affairs judge less harshly upon sexual infidelity because it is distinct from emotional infidelity. In Danish society, having sex does not necessarily imply a deep emotional attachment. As a result, infidelity does not carry such a severe negative connotation. A comparison between modern-day Chinese and American societies showed that there was greater distress with sexual infidelity in the U.S. than in China. The cultural difference is most likely due to the more restrictive nature of Chinese society, thus making infidelity a less salient concern there. Sexual promiscuity is more prominent in the United States, thus it follows that American society is more preoccupied with infidelity than Chinese society. Often, a single predominant religion can influence the culture of an entire nation. Even within Christianity in the United States, there are discrepancies as to how extramarital affairs are viewed. For instance, Protestants and Catholics do not view infidelity with equal severity. The conception of marriage is also markedly different; while in Roman Catholicism marriage is seen as an indissoluble sacramental bond and does not permit divorce even in cases of infidelity, most Protestant denominations allow for divorce and remarriage for infidelity or other reasons. Ultimately, it was seen that adults that associated with a religion (any denomination) were found to view infidelity as much more distressing than those who were not affiliated with a religion. Those that participated more heavily in their religions were even more conservative in their views on infidelity.

Some research has also suggested that being African American has a positive correlation to infidelity, even when education attainment is controlled for. Other research suggests that lifetime incidence of infidelity does not differ between African Americans and whites, only the likelihood of when they engage in it. Race and gender have been found to be positively correlated with infidelity, however this is the case more often for African American men engaging in extramarital infidelity. Human mating strategies differ from culture to culture. For example, Schmitt discusses how tribal cultures with higher pathogen stress are more likely to have polygynous marriage systems; whereas monogamous mating systems usually have relatively lower high-pathogen environments. In addition researchers have also proposed the idea that high mortality rates in local cultures should be correlated with more permissive mating strategies. On the other hand, Schmitt discusses how demanding reproductive environments should increase the desire and pursuit of biparental, monogamous relationships.

=== Strategic pluralism theory ===
Strategic pluralism is a theory that focuses on how environmental factors influence mating strategies. According to this theory, when people live within environments that are demanding and stressful, the need for bi-parental care is greater for increasing the survival of offspring. Correspondingly, monogamy and commitment are more commonplace. On the other hand, when people live within environments that encompass little stress and threats to the viability of offspring, the need for serious and committed relations is lowered, and therefore promiscuity and infidelity are more common.

=== Sex-ratio theory ===
Sex ratio theory is a theory that explains the relationship and sexual dynamics within different areas of the world based on the ratio of the number of marriage-aged men to marriage-aged women. According to this theory, an area has a high sex ratio when there is a higher number of marriage-aged women to marriage-aged men and an area has a low sex ratio when there are more marriage-aged men. In terms of infidelity, the theory states that when sex ratios are high, men are more likely to be promiscuous and engage in sex outside of a committed relationship because the demand for men is higher and this type of behavior, desired by men, is more accepted. On the other hand, when sex ratios are low, promiscuity is less common because women are in demand and since they desire monogamy and commitment, in order for men to remain competitive in the pool of mates, they must respond to these desires. Support for this theory comes from evidence showing higher divorce rates in countries with higher sex ratios and higher monogamy rates in countries with lower sex ratios.

== Other contributing factors ==
While infidelity is by no means exclusive to certain groups of people, its perception can be influenced by other factors. Furthermore, within a "homogeneous culture", like that in the United States, factors like community size can be strong predictors of how infidelity is perceived. Larger communities tend to care less about infidelity whereas small towns are much more concerned with such issues. These patterns are observed in other cultures as well. For example, a cantina in a small, rural Mexican community is often viewed as a place where "decent" or "married" women do not go because of its semi-private nature. Conversely, public spaces like the market or plaza are acceptable areas for heterosexual interaction. A smaller population size presents the threat of being publicly recognized for infidelity. However, within a larger community of the same Mexican society, entering a bar or watering hole would garner a different view. It would be deemed perfectly acceptable for both married and unmarried individuals to drink at a bar in a large city. These observations can be paralleled to rural and urban societies in the United States as well. Ultimately, these variables and societal differences dictate attitudes towards sexual infidelity which can vary across cultures as well as within cultures.

"Mate poaching" is the phenomenon of a single person luring a person who is in an intimate relationship to leave their partner for the single person. According to a survey of 16,964 individuals in 53 countries by David Schmitt (2001), mate poaching happens significantly more frequently in Middle Eastern countries such as Turkey and Lebanon, and less frequently in East Asian countries such as China and Japan.

=== Evolutionary factors ===
The parental investment theory is used to explain evolutionary pressures that can account for sex differences in infidelity. This theory states that the sex that invests less in the offspring has more to gain from indiscriminate sexual behaviour. This means that women, who typically invest more time and energy into raising their offspring (9 months of carrying offspring, breast feeding etc.), should be more choosy when it comes to mate selection and should therefore desire long-term, monogamous relationships that would ensure the viability of their offspring. Men on the other hand, have less parental investment and so they are driven towards indiscriminate sexual activity with multiple partners as such activity increases the likelihood of their reproduction. This theory says that it is these evolutionary pressures that act on men and women differentially and what ultimately drives more men to seek sexual activity outside of their own relationships. It can however, still account for the occurrence of extradyadic sexual relationships among women. For example, a woman whose husband has fertilization difficulties can benefit from engaging in sexual activity outside of her relationship. She can gain access to high-quality genes and still derive the benefit of parental investment from her husband or partner who is unknowingly investing in their illegitimate child.

=== Defense mechanisms ===
One defense mechanism that some researchers believe is effective at preventing infidelity is jealousy. Jealousy is an emotion that can elicit strong responses. Cases have been commonly documented where sexual jealousy was a direct cause of murders and morbid jealousy. Buss (2005) states that jealousy has three main functions to help prevent infidelity. These suggestions are:

- It can alert an individual to threats with a valued relationship.
- It can be activated by the presence of interested and more desirable intrasexual rivals.
- It can function as a motivational mechanism that creates behavioral outputs to deter infidelity and abandonment.

Looking at jealousy's physiological mechanism offers support for this idea. Jealousy is a form of stress response which has been shown to activate the sympathetic nervous system by increasing heart rate, blood pressure, and respiration. This will activate the "fight or flight" response to ensure action against the attempt at sexual infidelity in their partner. Buss and his colleagues were the first to pioneer a theory that jealousy is an evolved human emotion that has become an innate module, hard-wired to prevent infidelity from occurring. This idea is commonly referred to as Jealousy as a Specific Innate Module and has become widely debated. The basis behind this argument is that jealousy was beneficial in our ancestor's time when cuckoldry was more common. They suggested that those who were equipped with this emotional response could more effectively stop infidelity and those without the emotional response had a harder time doing so. Because infidelity imposed such a fitness cost, those who had the jealous emotional response, improved their fitness, and could pass down the jealousy module to the next generation.

Another defense mechanism for preventing infidelity is by social monitoring and acting on any violation of expectations. Researchers in favor of this defense mechanism speculate that in our ancestor's times, the act of sex or emotional infidelity is what triggered jealousy and therefore the signal detection would have happened only after infidelity had occurred, making jealousy an emotional by-product with no selective function. In line with this reasoning, these researchers hypothesize that as a person monitors their partner's actions with a potential rival through primary and secondary appraisals; if their expectations are violated at either level of observation, they will become distressed and enact an appropriate action to stop the chance of infidelity. Social monitoring therefore enables them to act accordingly before infidelity occurs, thereby having the capability to raise their fitness. Research testing this theory has found more favor for the sexual jealousy hypothesis.

A more recently suggested defense mechanism of infidelity attracting more attention is that a particular social group will punish cheaters by damaging their reputation. The basis for this suggestion stems from the fact that humans have an unmatched ability to monitor social relationships and inflict punishment on cheaters, regardless of the context. This punishment comes in many forms, one of which is gossip. This damage will impair the future benefits that individual can confer from the group and its individuals. A damaged reputation is especially debilitating when related to sexual and emotional infidelity, because it can limit future reproductive mate choices within the group and will cause a net fitness cost that outweighs the fitness benefit gained from the infidelity. Such limitations and costs deter an individual from cheating in the first place. Support for this defense mechanism comes from fieldwork by Hirsch and his colleagues (2007) that found that gossip about extramarital affairs in a small community in Mexico was particularly prevalent and devastating for reputation in this region. Specifically, adultery was found to cause an individual to be disowned by their family, decrease the marriage value of his/her family, cause an individual to lose money or a job, and diminish future reproductive potential. In this community, men having extramarital affairs did so in private areas with lower prevalence of women connected to the community, such as bars and brothels, both areas of which had a high risk of contracting sexually transmitted infections.

== The Internet ==
The proliferation of sex chat rooms and dating apps has increased the opportunity for people in committed relationships to engage in acts of infidelity on and off the Internet. A cyber affair is defined as "a romantic or sexual relationship initiated by online contact and maintained primarily via online communication". Sexual acts online include behaviors such as cybersex, where two or more individuals engage in discussions about sexual fantasies over the Internet and is usually accompanied by masturbation; hot-chatting, where discussions between two or more people move away from light-hearted flirting; and emotional acts where people disclose intimate information to a significant other. A new type of sexual activity online is when two people's avatars engage in sexual activity in virtual reality worlds such as Second Life. The majority of Americans believe that if a partner engaged in cybersex this constitutes as an act of infidelity. Spread of online communications also widened the "gray area" of the definition of infidelity, so called "microcheating".

A 2005 survey of 1828 participants reported one third of them reported engaging in cybersex and of that one third, 46% said they were in a committed relationship with someone else.

In an attempt to differentiate offline and online infidelity, Cooper, Morahan-Martin, Mathy, and Maheu constructed a "Triple-A Engine", which identifies the three aspects of Internet infidelity that distinguish it, to some degree, from traditional infidelity:

- Accessibility: the more access one has to the Internet, the more likely they will engage in infidelity
- Affordability: the monetary cost of being able to access the Internet continues to drop, and for a small price, a user can visit many sites, and meet multiple potential sexual needs
- Anonymity: the Internet allows users to masquerade as someone else, or hide their identity altogether.

In a study of 335 Dutch undergraduate students involved in serious intimate relationships, participants were presented with four dilemmas concerning a partner's emotional and sexual infidelity over the Internet. They found a significant sex difference as to whether participants chose sexual and emotional infidelity as more upsetting. More men than women indicated that a partner's sexual involvement would upset them more than a partner's emotional bonding with someone else. Similarly, in the dilemma involving infidelity over the Internet, more men indicated their partner's sexual involvement would upset them more than a partner's emotional bonding with someone else. Women, on the other hand, expressed more problems with emotional infidelity over the Internet than did men.

Online infidelity can be just as damaging to a relationship as offline physical unfaithfulness. A possible explanation is that our brain registers virtual and physical acts the same way and responds similarly. Several studies have concluded that online infidelity, whether sexual or emotional in nature, often leads to off-line infidelity.

=== Chat rooms ===
A study by Beatriz Lia Avila Mileham in 2004 examined the phenomenon of online infidelity in chat rooms. The following factors were investigated: what elements and dynamics online infidelity involves and how it happens; what leads individuals specifically to the computer to search for a relationship on the side; whether individuals consider online contacts as infidelity and why or why not; and what dynamics chat room users experience in their marriages. The results led to three constructs that symbolize chat room dynamics and serve as a foundation for Internet infidelity:

- Anonymous sexual interactionism: the individuals' predilection for anonymous interactions of a sexual nature in chat rooms. The allure of anonymity gains extra importance for married individuals, who can enjoy relative safety to express fantasies and desires without being known or exposed.
- Behavioral rationalization: the reasoning that chat room users present for conceiving their online behaviors as innocent and harmless, despite the secrecy and highly sexual nature.
- Effortless avoidance: chat room users' lack of psychological discomfort in exchanging sexual messages with strangers.

== Legal implications ==
All countries in Europe, as well as most countries in Latin America have decriminalized adultery; however, in many countries in Africa and Asia (particularly the Middle East) this type of infidelity is criminalized. Even where infidelity is not a criminal offense, it may have legal implications in divorce cases; for example it may be a factor in property settlement, the custody of children, the denial of alimony, etc. In civil claims, not only the spouse, but also the "other man/other woman" may be held accountable: for example, seven US states (Hawaii, Illinois, North Carolina, Mississippi, New Mexico, South Dakota, and Utah) allow the possibility of the tort action of alienation of affections (brought by a deserted spouse against a third party alleged to be responsible for the failure of the marriage). In a highly publicized case in 2010, a woman in North Carolina won a $9 million suit against her husband's mistress. In the United States, criminal laws relating to infidelity vary, and those states that criminalize adultery rarely prosecute the offense. Penalties for adultery range from life imprisonment in Michigan, to a $10 fine in Maryland or class 1 felony in Wisconsin. The constitutionality of US criminal laws on adultery is unclear due to Supreme Court decisions in 1965 giving privacy of sexual intimacy to consenting adults, as well as broader implications of Lawrence v. Texas (2003). Adultery is declared to be illegal in 21 states.

In many jurisdictions, adultery may have indirect legal implications, particularly in cases of infliction of violence, such as domestic assaults and killings, in particular by mitigating murder to manslaughter, or otherwise providing for partial or complete defenses in case of violence, especially in cultures where there is a traditional toleration of crimes of passion and honor killings. Such provisions have been condemned by the Council of Europe and the United Nations in recent years. The Council of Europe Recommendation Rec(2002)5 of the Committee of Ministers to member states on the protection of women against violence states that member states should: "(...) 57. preclude adultery as an excuse for violence within the family." UN Women has also stated in regard to the defense of provocation and other similar defenses: "Laws should clearly state that these defenses do not include or apply to crimes of 'honour', adultery, or domestic assault or murder."

== Workplace issues ==
As the number of women in the workforce increases to match that of men, researchers expect the likelihood of infidelity will also increase with workplace interactions. Wiggins and Lederer (1984) found that opportunities to engage in infidelity were related to the workplace where nearly one half of their samples who engaged in infidelity were involved with coworkers. A study done by McKinnish (2007) found that those who work with a larger fraction of workers of the opposite sex are more likely to be divorced due to infidelity. Kuroki found that married women were less likely to have a workplace affair, whereas self-employed individuals are more likely. In 2000, Treas and Giesen found similar results where sexual opportunities in the workplace increased the likelihood of infidelity during the last 12 months.

Adulterous office romances are widely considered to be unhelpful to business and work relationships, and superior-subordinate relationships are banned in 90% of companies with written policies regarding office romance. Companies cannot ban adultery, as, in all but a handful of states, such regulations would run afoul of laws prohibiting discrimination on the basis of marital status. Firings nonetheless often occur on the basis of charges of inappropriate office conduct.

Academics and therapists say cheating is probably more prevalent on the road than close to home. The protection of the road offers a secret life of romance, far from spouses or partners. Affairs range from one-night stands to relationships that last for years. They are usually with a co-worker, a business associate or someone they repeatedly encounter.

Another reason for the development of office romances is the amount of time co-workers spend together. Spouses today often spend more time with co-workers in the office than with each other. A Newsweek article notes, "Nearly 60 percent of American women work outside the home, up from about 40 percent in 1964. Quite simply, women intersect with more people during the day than they used to. They go to more meetings, take more business trips and, presumably, participate more in flirtatious water-cooler chatter."

According to Debra Laino in an article for Shave, some of the reasons women cheat at the workplace are because "women are disproportionately exposed to men in the workplace, and, as a direct consequence, many have more options and chances to cheat."

== Alternative views (swinging and polyamory) ==
Swinging is a form of extradyadic sex where married couples exchange partners with each other. Swinging was originally called "wife-swapping", but due to the sexist connotations and the fact that many wives were willing to swap partners, "mate swapping" and or "swinging" was substituted. The Supreme Court of Canada has ruled swinging is legal as long as it takes place in a private place and is consensual. Swinging can be closed or open, where couples meet and each pair goes off to a separate room or they have sex in the same room. The majority of swingers fall into the middle and upper classes, with an above average education and income, and majority of these swingers are white (90%). A study done by Jenks in 1986 found that swingers are not significantly different from non-swingers on measures such as philosophy, authoritarianism, self-respect, happiness, freedom, equality etc. Swingers tend to emphasize personal values over more social ones. According to Henshel (1973), the initiation into the world of swinging usually is done by the husband.

Reasons for getting involved in swinging are the variety of sexual partners and experiences, pleasure or excitement, meeting new people, and voyeurism. In order for swinging to work, both partners need to have a liberal sexual predisposition, and a low degree of jealousy. Gilmartin (1975) found that 85% of his sample of swingers felt that these sexual encounters posed no real threat to their marriage and felt it had improved. Jenks (1998) found no reason to believe that swinging was detrimental to marriage, with over 91% of males and 82% of females indicating they were happy with swinging.

Another form of extradyadic sex is polyamory, a "non-possessive, honest, responsible and ethical philosophy and practice of loving multiple people simultaneously". There are various types of relationships in polyamory such as intentional family, group relationship, and group marriage. One type of group relationship can be a triad involving a married couple and an additional person who all share sexual intimacy, however, it is usually an addition of a female. Unlike polygyny or polyandry, both men and women may have multiple partners within the confines of polyamory. Polyamorous relationships are distinguished from extramarital affairs by the full disclosure and consent of all involved. Polyamorous relationships may specify unique boundaries outside monogamous expectations of fidelity, that if violated are still considered cheating. Because both men and women can have multiple partners, these individuals do not consider themselves to be either uncommitted or unfaithful.

== See also ==
- Crime of passion
- Cuckold and cuckquean
- Emotional affair
- Financial infidelity
- Fornication
- Open marriage
- Polygyny threshold model
- Relational transgressions
- Seduction
- Zināʾ
