= Bergen Shopping Addiction Scale =

Screening tool for shopping addictions

- Purpose: assessing the severity of shopping addiction

The Bergen Shopping Addiction Scale (BSAS) is a brief screening tool for assessing the severity of shopping addiction.

== Background ==
The Bergen Scale is named after the city of Bergen, Norway, the location of the University of Bergen, where lead author Cecilie Andreassen is a professor of clinical psychology.

== Format ==
The Bergen Shopping Addiction Scale (BSAS) consists of 28 statements. The participant is asked to rate how strongly each of the statements relates to their thoughts and behavior in the last 12 months. Each item is rated on a five-point continuum of agreement: completely disagree, disagree, neither disagree nor agree, agree, completely agree. Groups of four items are targeted toward each of seven addiction criteria (salience, mood modification, conflict, tolerance, withdrawal, relapse, and problems).

== Improvements ==
The BSAS offers several improvements over prior compulsive shopping assessments.

- Compulsive shopping has been increasingly placed within the behavioral addiction paradigm, while existing assessments have primarily been rooted within the impulse-control or obsessive–compulsive disorder paradigms.
- While existing screens tend not assess the core criteria and components of addiction, the BSAS directly addresses each of the seven addiction criteria with sets of four items.
- Unlike existing screens, which tend to use the terms "shopping," "buying," and "spending" interchangeably, the BSAS items were created with the nuance between these terms in mind and is generally more reflective of contemporary shopping habits.

== See also ==
- Diagnostic classification and rating scales used in psychiatry
