= MrMarmot =

Chinese YouTuber and video game artist

- Born: Shanghai, China
- Occupations: Video game artist; YouTube Creator; VTuber

YouTube information
- Channel: 一隻土撥鼠MrMarmot
- Years active: 2022–present
- Genres: Animation; politics; society
- Subscribers: 462 thousand
- Views: 60.2 million
- Last updated: June 19, 2026

MrMarmot (一隻土撥鼠) is a Chinese YouTuber and full-time video game artist based in Los Angeles, United States. His channel primarily features personal stories and commentary on social and political topics. He is known for videos such as The Life of a Little Pink (小粉紅的一生) and When China Liberated the World... Cyber Dissident 2077 (當中國解放了全世界⋯⋯賽博反賊2077). He also presents himself as an animal-themed VTuber, appearing in videos and livestreams using an animal avatar. In his early videos, he stated that he had been repeatedly banned from Chinese social media platforms for publicly criticizing the government.

To escape the censorship of the Chinese Communist Party, he left China to pursue higher education abroad, enrolling at a university in the United States. He later found employment at a U.S.-based game development company.

== Works ==
=== The Life of a Little Pink ===
The Life of a Little Pink (Chinese: 小粉紅的一生) is a video uploaded by MrMarmot on October 28, 2023. Inspired by the Taiwanese video The Life of a Mountain Road Monkey, the video tells the tragic story of a young nationalist known as "Little Pink" Wojak, who turns a blind eye to domestic problems such as unemployment and government-business collusion in China, and ultimately faces misfortune due to the harshness of reality.

At the beginning of the video, Wojak sees news about someone starving to death due to unemployment and blames the victim for not working hard enough. Later, he experiences pay cuts and layoffs himself, and realizes that his friends are also struggling with unemployment. Despite this, he continues to believe in the stability of China's economy and blames the United States for the problems. When his domestically produced smartphone malfunctions, he is met with online abuse while seeking help and is mistreated by the seller. Nevertheless, he insists his phone is better than an iPhone.

Wojak eventually finds a low-paying factory job, only to discover that the factory owner did not pay the workers' wages and ran away, sparking protests. Wojak joins the protests but is suppressed by the police and hospitalized. In the end, he exposes the corrupt company but is cyberbullied and banned from platforms, ultimately dying of hunger. The incident is reported in the media, but he is mocked by another "Little Pink." Through this tragedy, the video critiques the Institutional issues of authoritarian societies and highlights the contrast between official propaganda and lived reality.

The video ends with a quote from the United States Declaration of Independence:

All men are created equal, that they are endowed by their Creator with certain unalienable Rights, that among these are Life, Liberty and the pursuit of Happiness.

=== Cyber Dissident 2077 ===
When China Liberated the World... Cyber Dissident 2077(當中國解放了全世界⋯⋯賽博反賊2077) is an animated video uploaded by MrMarmot on November 10, 2023, inspired by Cyberpunk 2077. Set in the year 2077, the video imagines a dystopian world where the Chinese Communist Party has taken over the globe. It depicts a totalitarian society with omnipresent surveillance, a social credit system, and strict speech control, where citizens wear metaphorical masks to survive, while some choose to resist. The video draws inspiration from the Taiwanese animation The Life of the Mountain Road Monkey, depicting the story of individuals who rise up against oppressive rule, only to be brutally suppressed.

The story follows protagonist Wojak, identified by the number 8964, whose social credit score declines due to monitored speech. Drawing from the Hong Kong anti-extradition protests, the video illustrates themes of resistance and repression. In the end, a special police officer has a change of heart and apologizes to the victims, suggesting the eventual fall of totalitarian rule. The film satirizes the mechanisms of authoritarian control and pays tribute to Hong Kong protesters.

The video closes with a quote from Lu Xun's Huagai Collection(華蓋集):

The brave are angry and draw their swords against the strong; the cowardly are angry and draw their swords against the weak.
