= Microcheating =

Subtle behaviors causing mistrust in a relationship

Microcheating (also micro-cheating) is a controversial aspect of the definition of infidelity, covering activities that were not traditionally considered infidelity, but can be viewed as breaches of trust leading to the ultimate betrayal in a relationship or its breakdown. Examples can be very diverse: taking off a wedding band when going to a party, spending extra time with a person one finds sexually attractive, browsing profiles on a dating app. The term is a neologism, with limited scholarship available as of mid-2020s, and subject mostly discussed in the mass media and on the Internet, where it was apparently popularized by an Australian TV personality Melanie Schilling.

The concept might become an issue in a relationship if a couple (or one partner) takes it to extremes. For example, the arrangement where a lunch out or interaction on a social media platform with a person that could become a potential partner are off-limits, signals a basic lack of trust and an unreasonable expectation that partners in the relationship should be the only source of friendship, energy, entertainment, and inspiration for each other. Instead, partners in secure relationship might accept that world is full of potential other partners, do not consider attractiveness of others threatening and potentially use the situation as a source of eroticism. The reasonable boundaries might be defined by intent behind the actions, identified by the presence of secrecy, emotional intimacy, sexual chemistry.

L.A Robinson from the Telegraph writes that the eight signs of micro-cheating are: Hiding someone from your partner in daily recaps; Sending them "thought of you" tokens; Sharing private in-jokes and laughter; Sending them intimate songs; Turning to them first for comfort instead of your partner; Grooming or dressing up more for them; Lingering too long flirting at work drinks, and bringing them along for clothes-shopping opinions.

== Sources ==
- Timm, Tina M.; Hertlein, Katherine (2020-05-11). "Affair Recovery in Couple Therapy". The Handbook of Systemic Family Therapy. Wiley. pp. 343–361. doi:10.1002/9781119790945.ch15. ISBN 978-1-119-70222-1.
- Karpuz, Ali; Çelik Özkan, Gizem (2024-06-25). "Görünmez Sınırlar: Mikro Aldatma ve Romantik İlişkilerdeki İnce Çizgiler" [Invisible Boundaries: Micro-cheating and the Sensitive Lines in Romantic Relationships]. Türk Akademik Araştırmalar Dergisi [Turkish Academic Research Review] (in Turkish). 9 (2): 188–204. doi:10.30622/tarr.1415530. hdl:11552/4247. ISSN 2602-2923.
