= Financial infidelity =

Money disorder

Financial infidelity is a negative money behavior, known as a money disorder, in which financial deceit is performed toward a romantic partner. Couple patterns of behavior related to money, including financial infidelity, can significantly influence relationship satisfaction and stability. In a 2018 exploratory study, 27% of participants reported hiding a financial secret from their romantic partner at some point while 53% of participants indicated they had engaged in behaviors that would be classified as financial infidelity. Examples of financial infidelity include lying about purchases, hiding a gambling problem, having a secret savings account, and hiding debt.

== Causes ==
One suggested association with financial infidelity is the process by which couples manage their finances. Jeanfreu et al. found that couples with a set structure for how they manage their money (for example, with specific responsibilities allotted to each partner or regular collaborative financial sessions) were less likely to experience financial infidelity than the couples who did not have a set structure. Similarly, researchers have postulated that individuals may not recognize their behavior falls into the category of financial infidelity or that the deceit is so small that it would not matter.

The 2021 Harris Poll found reasons for financial infidelity included the desire for financial privacy (38% of respondents), embarrassment or fear (33% of respondents), and partner disapproval (61% of respondents). Canale et al. credit gendered world views of money (competitive versus collaborative) leading to conflict avoidance as a reason for financial infidelity, along with hidden marital affairs, self-protection, and potential relationship exit strategies. Jeanfreu et al. found the top two cited reasons for financial infidelity were conflict avoidance and spending on oneself.

== Effects ==
Jeanfreu et al. found that life satisfaction and marital satisfaction were lower for people who experienced financial infidelity than for those who did not. The 2021 Harris Poll related a diversity of effects from financial infidelity ranging from 19% of respondents improving their romantic relationship after the experience to 16% of respondents reporting divorce and 13% reporting separation. When patterns of financial infidelity develop within a relationship that subsequently ends, decreased trust is carried into new romantic relationships with resulting issues.

== Theories and interventions ==
Research and couples therapy around family financial issues is a relatively new field that uses various theories as a foundation for practice. The Couples and Finance Theory (CFT) is a theoretical framework used in the financial planning research and therapy which asserts that financial processes and couple processes are interconnected so that an improvement in one will equate to an improvement in the other. Social exchange theory, which outlines how romantic partners’ financial decisions were based on a relational cost-benefit analysis, was the foundation for a scale developed to measure the opposite of financial infidelity, which is financial transparency. One example of an intervention used to treat financial infidelity is the Klontz and Klontz (2009) SAFE intervention. Other commonly used interventions come from the field of marriage and family therapy.

== Measurement ==
Financial infidelity has been measured via the following:

- 2021 National Endowment for Financial Education Harris Poll
- The Financial Transparency Scale
- The Financial Infidelity Scale

== See also ==
- Credit counseling
- Money disorder
- Relational disorder
