= Compulsive buying disorder =

Buying behavior that causes adverse consequences

- Other names: Compulsive buying–shopping disorder
- Specialty: Psychiatry

Compulsive buying disorder (CBD) is characterized by an obsession with shopping and buying behavior that causes adverse consequences. It "is experienced as a recurring, compelling and irresistible–compulsive urge, in acquiring goods that lack practical utility and very low cost resulting in excessive, expensive and time-consuming retail activity [that is] typically prompted by negative affectivity" and results in "gross social, personal and/or financial difficulties". Most people with CBD meet the criteria for a personality disorder. Compulsive buying can also be found among people with Parkinson's disease or frontotemporal dementia.

Compulsive buying–shopping disorder is classified by the ICD-11 among "other specified impulse control disorders". Several authors have considered compulsive shopping rather as a variety of dependence disorder. The DSM-5 did not include compulsive buying disorder in its chapter concerning substance-related and addictive disorders, since there is "still debate on whether other less recognized forms of impulsive behaviors, such as compulsive buying [...] can be conceptualized as addictions."

== Characteristics ==
CBD is characterized by an obsession with shopping and buying behavior that causes adverse consequences. According to Kellett and Bolton, it "is experienced as an irresistible–uncontrollable urge, resulting in excessive, expensive and time-consuming retail activity [that is] typically prompted by negative affectivity" and results in "gross social, personal and/or financial difficulties". What differentiates CBD from healthy shopping is the compulsive, destructive and chronic nature of the buying. Where shopping can be a positive route to self-expression, in excess it represents a dangerous threat.

CBD is frequently comorbid with mood, anxiety, substance abuse and eating disorders. People who score highly on compulsive-buying scales tend to understand their feelings poorly and have low tolerance for unpleasant psychological states such as negative moods. The onset of CBD occurs in the late teens and early twenties and is generally chronic. The phenomenon of compulsive buying tends to affect women rather than men. The aforementioned reports on this matter indicated that the dominance of the majority group is so great that it accounts for more than 90% of the affected demographic. Zadka and Olajossy suggest the presence of several similar tendencies between consumer-type mannerisms and pathologic consumption of psychoactive elements. These tendencies include a constant need to consume, personal dependence, and a tendency to lack a sense of self-control over behavior. Additionally, Zadka and Olajossy state that one could conclude that individuals suffering from the disorder are often in the second decade to fourth decade of their lives and exhibit mannerisms akin to neurotic personality and impulse-control disorders.

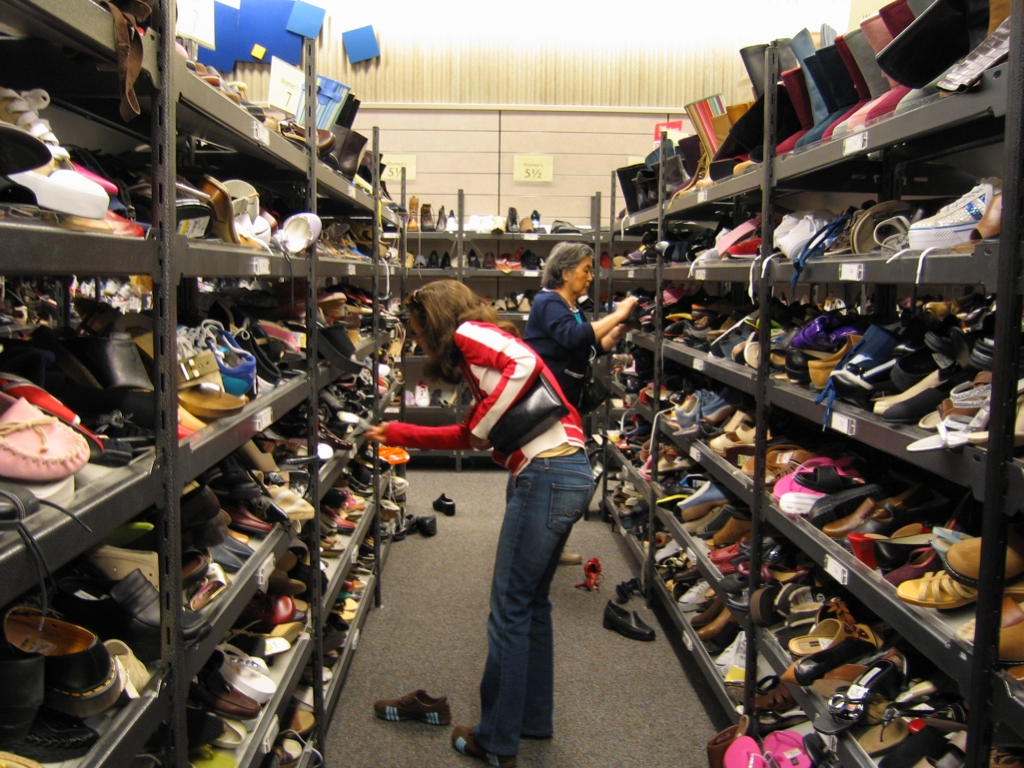
Compulsive buying disorder

CBD is similar to, but distinguished from, hoarding disorder and mania. Compulsive buying is not limited to people who spend beyond their means; it also includes people who spend an inordinate amount of time shopping or who chronically think about buying things but never purchase them. Promising treatments for CBD include medication such as selective serotonin reuptake inhibitors (SSRIs), and support groups such as Debtors Anonymous.

Research reveals that 1.8–8.1% of the general adult population have CBD and that while the usual onset is late adolescence or early adulthood, it is often recognized as a problem later in life.

=== Consequences ===
Problems associated with CBD can include ruined credit history, theft or defalcation of money, defaulted loans, general financial trouble and in some cases bankruptcy or extreme debt, as well as anxiety and a sense of life spiraling out of control.

=== Distinctions ===
Unlike normal consumers and hoarders, who derive excitement and focus on the items purchased, compulsive buyers gain excitement and focus on the acquisition process itself and not the item purchased.

Compulsive buying disorder is tightly associated with excessive or poorly managed urges related to the purchase of the items and spending of currency in any form; digital, mobile, credit or cash.

Four phases have been identified in compulsive buying: anticipation, preparation, shopping, and spending. The first phase involves a preoccupation with purchasing a specific item or with shopping in general. The second phase the individual plans the shopping excursion. The third phase is the actual shopping event; while the fourth phase is completed by the feelings of excitement connected to spending money on their desired items.

The terms compulsive shopping, compulsive buying, and compulsive spending are often used interchangeably, but the behaviors they represent are in fact distinct. One may buy without shopping, and certainly shop without buying: of compulsive shoppers, some 30 percent described the act of buying itself as providing a buzz, irrespective of the goods purchased.

== Causes ==
Compulsive buying can be found among people with Parkinson's disease or frontotemporal dementia.

From a medical perspective, it can be concluded that impulse-control disorders are attributed to the desire for positive stimuli. The normal method of operation in a healthy brain is that the frontal cortex regulation handles the activity of reward. However, in individuals with behavioral disorders, this particular system malfunctions. Scientists have reported that compulsive buyers have significantly different activity in this area of the brain.

Those with associated disorders such as post-traumatic stress disorder, anxiety, depression and poor impulse control are particularly likely to attempt to treat symptoms of low self-esteem through compulsive shopping.

== Diagnosis ==
Diagnostic criteria for compulsive buying have been proposed:

1. Over-preoccupation with buying.
2. Distress or impairment as a result of the activity.
3. Compulsive buying is not limited to hypomanic or manic episodes.
4. Constant obsessing with buying as well as being dissatisfied all the time.

== Treatment ==
Treatment involves becoming conscious of the addiction through studying, therapy and group work. Research done by Michel Lejoyeux and Aviv Weinstein suggests that the best possible treatment for CBD is cognitive behavioral therapy. They suggest that a patient first be "evaluated for psychiatric comorbidity, especially with depression, so that appropriate pharmacological treatment can be instituted." Their research indicates that patients who received cognitive behavioral therapy over 10 weeks had reduced episodes of compulsive buying and spent less time shopping as opposed to patients who did not receive this treatment.

Lejoyeux and Weinstein also write about pharmacological treatment and studies that question the use of drugs on CBD. They declare "few controlled studies have assessed the effects of pharmacological treatment on compulsive buying, and none have shown any medication to be effective." The most effective treatment is to attend therapy and group work in order to prevent continuation of this addiction.

Hague et al. reports that group therapy rendered the highest results as far as treatment of compulsive buying disorder is concerned. He states that group therapy contributed to about 72.8% in positive change in the reduction of urges of compulsive spending. Additionally, he notes that psychotherapy may not be the treatment of choice for all compulsive buying disorder patients since the suitability of the treatment method to the patient is also an important consideration. He holds that the treatments of the disorder are required to provide a certain reflection of the context in which this phenomenon manifests.

Selective serotonin reuptake inhibitors such as fluvoxamine and citalopram may be useful in the treatment of CBD, although current evidence is mixed. Opioid antagonists such as naltrexone and nalmefene are promising potential treatments for CBD. A review concluded that evidence is limited and insufficient to support their use at present, however. Naltrexone and nalmefene have also shown effectiveness in the treatment of gambling addiction, an associated disorder.

== History ==
According to German physician Max Nordau, French psychiatrist Valentin Magnan coined the term oniomania in the 1892 German translation of his Psychiatric Lectures (Psychiatrische Vorlesungen). Magnan describes compulsive buying as a symptom of social degeneration. In his book Degeneration (1892), Nordau calls oniomania or "buying craze" a "stigma of degeneration". Emil Kraepelin described oniomania as of 1909, and he and Bleuler both included the syndrome in their influential early psychiatric textbooks. Kraepelin described oniomania as "a pathological desire to buy... without any actual need and in great quantities", considering it alongside kleptomania and other conditions that were thought to be related to impulsivity (of the type nowadays denoted impulse-control disorders).

Relatively little interest seems to have been taken in collocating CBD as a distinct pathology until the 1990s. Since 2019, ICD-11 (the 11th revision of the International Classification of Diseases) has classified it among "other specified impulse control disorders" (coded as 6C7Y), using the descriptor compulsive buying-shopping disorder.

== Society and culture ==
=== Historical examples ===
- Mary Todd Lincoln (1818–1882), wife of US president Abraham Lincoln, was allegedly addicted to shopping, running up (and concealing) large bills on credit, feeling manic glee at spending sprees, followed by depressive reactions in the face of the results.

=== Social psychological perspective ===
A social psychological perspective suggests that compulsive buying may be seen as an exaggerated form of a more normal search for validation through purchasing. Also, pressures from the spread of materialist values and consumer culture over the recent decades can drive people into compulsive shopping.

Companies have adopted aggressive neuromarketing by associating the identification of a high social status with the purchasing of items. They strive to bring out such an individual as a sort of folk hero for having the ability to buy several items. As a result, according to Zadka and Olajossy, the act of shopping is then associated with the feeling of holding a higher social status or of climbing the social ranks. Zadka holds that these companies take advantage of the frailties of peoples' egos in an attempt to get them to spend their money.

== See also ==
- Shopping addiction
- Money disorder
- Shopaholic (novels)
- Confessions of a Shopaholic (film)
