= Money worship =

Money disorder

Money worship is a type of money disorder, with the core driver being the belief that acquiring more money will lead to greater happiness. Individuals with this disorder are obsessed with the idea that obtaining more money is necessary to make progress in life and simultaneously convinced that they will never have enough money to fulfill their needs or desires. Those afflicted with this money disorder will likely take drastic action, including the irresponsible and harmful selling of their own property, relationships, and body, to satisfy their pathological desires.

== Money worship and types of money ==
Different forms of money may lead to different extents of money worship. A banknote has a given amount of value, so the extent to which a money worshiper can spend is limited. On the other hand, credit cards offer the illusion of an unlimited amount of money to the person, which can lead to high debt and negative psychological impacts such as higher anxiety levels.

== Susceptibility of money worship ==
Younger, single, and low-net-worth individuals are more likely to engage in this behavior, which has also been linked to a higher probability of carrying over credit card debt from month to month. Some suggest that young adults are most susceptible to money worship due to their higher impressionability from social forces such as social media and peer groups. This is accelerated by social media's promotion of consumerism. The content and advertisements seen may lead to increased spending desires.

== Money and Happiness ==
Money has been referred to as a "neglected" field in psychology. The studies which have been conducted regarding the paradox of happiness and income often failed to find causation that more money leads to more happiness, only finding a positive relationship when looking at short-term effects. However, this does not prove that money cannot buy happiness, because people may not spend their income in the optimal way to increase happiness. Steven and Wolfer (2008) claimed that "cross-section data suggests that the answer to the question whether higher income leads to greater happiness is 'yes'; on the other, the time-series data say 'no'."

The time-series data often come to the same conclusion as the Easterlin Paradox, which illustrates how, at a set point in time, more income can make people happier. However, this isn't constant, as happiness decreases as time passes. Findings that support the Easterlin Paradox indicate that long-term happiness is not correlated with money increase but does come from other, personal factors such as shelter, friendship, family, and food however, happiness is subjective to each person therefore the reason behind it is not universal. Some people suggest that money brings happiness, but Wessman (1956) found correlations which suggest the opposite. Instead, the observed relation suggests that marriage, doing good, friendships, religion, and love are more likely to lead to happiness. To a poor person, happiness could mean receiving a free apple from a good-hearted person. This aligns with the need theory that originates from Maslow's Hierarchy of needs. Need theory in the context of money promotes the view that money only brings happiness until all our basic needs are satisfied; after that, it no longer increases our happiness. A study conducted by Princeton University researchers in 2010 revealed that happiness increased based on income up to around $75,000 dollars in a sample taken in the US; after this, it tops out and no longer affects our happiness levels. Data derived from the Bureau of Labour Statistics found that the median necessary wage needed to live across the USA is $67,609 annually, which aligns with the results of the Princeton study, as both figures illustrate what is needed to meet our basic needs in life. Similar studies have been conducted in other countries, finding similar results.

Cross-sectional studies conducted on money worship include those comparing lottery winners' subjective happiness to those of accident victims or non-lottery winners finding that day-to-day happiness of lottery winners was the same with the main difference being what they perceived their future happiness would be, scoring it higher than the control groups. Furthermore, "every representative national survey ever done" has found a positive relationship between happiness and income; this research provides empirical data that, at set points in time, money can provide short-term happiness. Research has also been conducted on how age can affect our happiness from money, revealing that younger adults are more influenced by money than older participants. When socio-demographic explanatory variables were included in the study of income and happiness, the only group that still had a positive relationship was young adults. This is supportive of the idea that younger adults are more Susceptible to money worship and that happiness from money is temporary, as the inclusion of socio-demographic explanatory variables made the relationship between happiness and money insignificant for middle-aged and older adults.

While these different studies reveal that money doesn't bring constant, long-term happiness, only short-term, the Skandia International Wealth Sentiment Monitor, alongside other studies, did reveal that as many as 80% of people worldwide still hold the view that money will bring them happiness (the range between individual countries is 68% in Germany to 93% in Brazil). This ongoing belief that it brings happiness can result in money worship being described as a behavioral addiction; that is, a person's need to make money can affect their day-to-day life due to their growing focus on accumulating money. It can become a mood-altering experience and lead to emotional disruptions, sharing similarities with substance addictions. Their behavior becomes influenced and guided by their desire to make money due to the false belief that it will bring them happiness.

This belief presents much like money worship in science, as believers constantly desire more money, believing it to be a gift from God and that it would bring them happiness. Moreover, the Goddess Lakshmi is worshipped every Friday and on certain festivals in Hinduism; she is believed to be responsible for wealth and good fortune. Some believers keep silver coins with her image in their homes, believing it will bring them wealth. Other religions also have gods which represent money, such as Plutus, Oshun, and Mercury, amongst countless others. Money worship is a prominent theme across a variety of religions.

== Extreme cases of money worship ==
The first case is the gold diggers, who trade sex for money. Sex is the commodity she offers, and material or economic rewards are what she receives. This group of people is so heavily influenced by money worship that they view men as a means of making money. Also, this suggests that they believe someone’s worth is completely measured by the balance of his or her bank account, which is inaccurate, as people also have skills, relationships, and talents. Their sense of self-worth could be closely tied to their material possessions since the only contribution they can provide is sex. This group of people may have luxury obsessions, which can lead to financial irresponsibility and debt accumulation.

The second extreme case is when someone engages in compulsive gambling or pathological gambling. Pathological gamblers gamble more than others and build debt since losses outweigh wins in the long run. According to the American Psychiatric Association’s Diagnostic and Statistical Manual, pathological gamblers are preoccupied with gambling, need to gamble with more money to achieve excitement, are restless when attempting to stop gambling, etc. Gamblers may end up with debts and family issues, which have a huge negative impact on their daily life. In worse cases, excessive gambling can lead to suicide when the debt is too large and inhibits one from gambling further. In a nationally representative sample of Canadians, it was found that there was a correlation between pathological gambling and attempted suicide.

== Mitigating the negative effects of money worship ==
The first approach is to promote financial literacy and education. In a cross-country study, it has been suggested that there is an urgent need to improve financial literacy, as the average rate of financial literacy found was around 30%. By implementing comprehensive financial education programs in schools and communities, individuals can be taught to make informed financial decisions such as budgeting, saving, and investing. This can help individuals prioritize financial well-being over money worship. One example of financial education in the community is the International Federation of Finance Museums, which is a global organization that enhances financial literacy through exhibitions and exchange of resources.

The second approach is to provide access to mental health resources and services to individuals with psychological issues related to money worship, such as compulsive buying disorder or anxiety about financial status. Specifically, providing access to counselling, therapy, and support groups may be useful for people to develop healthier attitudes towards money.

The third approach is to promote sustainable shopping and ethical consumption practices. In online shopping platforms, nudges that promote sustainable shopping can be implemented. For example, when someone is about to check out, a default option for carbon-free delivery is shown to increase the likelihood of individuals choosing this method of delivery. Furthermore, rewards such as discounts can be provided to individuals who purchase products that require less packaging. By making individuals aware of the environmental impact that their consumer choices can have, individuals are encouraged to prioritize ethical considerations over their materialistic wants. This may reduce money-worshipping behaviour and foster healthier purchasing behaviour in consumers.
