= Money disorder =

Maladaptive patterns of financial beliefs and behaviors

Money disorders refer to problematic financial beliefs and behaviors that can cause significant distress and hinder one's social or occupational well-being. These issues often stem from financial stress or an inability to effectively utilize one's financial resources, leading to clinically significant challenges. Money disorders refer to enduring and often unchanging patterns of self-destructive financial behaviors that lead to considerable stress, anxiety, emotional anguish, and significant disruptions in various areas of a person's life.

Also known as disordered money behaviors, it is problematic financial behaviors people adopt in an effort to cope with emotional pain. Psychology and the mental health fields have largely neglected dysfunctional money disorders. The term is contentious among mental health professionals and as of 2023, money disorder is not a clinical diagnosis in either the DSM or ICD medical classifications of diseases and medical disorders. Although, it is debated that money disorders and disordered money behaviors are some of the worst chronic stressors affecting people on an ongoing basis. Disordered money behaviors have a psychological basis and may necessitate psychological intervention for resolution. The literature has identified eight distinct behavioral patterns associated with money disorders: pathological gambling, excessive spending and compulsive buying, gambling-related behaviors, restrained spending and compulsive hoarding, workaholism, financial dependence, financial enabling, financial denial/rejection, and financial enmeshment.

Some mental health practitioners say that those affected by money disorders or who have problematic money beliefs can seek financial therapy. With financial therapy, financial planners and therapists work together to provide comprehensive treatment to clients experiencing financial distress.

== Etiology ==
Money scripts are deeply ingrained beliefs and attitudes about money that individuals develop over time. These scripts shape their perceptions of money, influence their financial decisions, and impact their overall financial well-being. Typically formed during childhood, money scripts can have a profound and lasting effect on a person's financial behaviors.

Recognizing one's money scripts is vital in financial planning and counseling, as these underlying beliefs can significantly influence financial choices and behaviors. Identifying and challenging unhelpful money scripts can empower individuals to make more informed and balanced financial decisions. There are four primary categories of money scripts:

=== Money avoidance ===
People with money avoidance scripts often regard money as a source of negativity or believe they don't deserve financial success. This can lead to avoidance of financial matters and feelings of guilt related to money.

A 2008 study defined "phobic avoidance" as anxiety or fear in specific situations, leading individuals to avoid or confront them with distress. Money avoidance script involves evading financial responsibilities, blaming others, and viewing money negatively. This may be influenced by societal taboos about discussing finances.

Those with lower incomes, lower net worth, and younger age groups more commonly exhibit money avoidance scripts. People uncertain about their net worth also tend to score higher on these scripts compared to those with a clearer financial picture.

Disorders pertaining to money avoidance include financial denial, financial rejection, underspending and excessive risk aversion.

=== Money worship ===
Money worship scripts revolve around the idea that having more money will solve all problems and bring happiness. Individuals with this script may prioritize wealth above all else and continually strive to accumulate more.

Money worship falls under the individual being obsessed with obtaining more money and simply believing that the only way to progress in life would be to obtain more money, but at the same time believing no matter the amount of money they accumulate it won't meet their desires and wishes. Disorders associated with money worshipping include hoarding, unreasonable risk taking, pathological gambling, workaholism, overspending and compulsive buying disorder.

=== Money status ===
Money status scripts link an individual's self-worth to their financial success and the possessions they own. Those with this script may feel a strong need to display their wealth to gain approval or validation from others.

=== Money vigilance ===
Money vigilance scripts involve a cautious and often anxious approach to managing money. Individuals with this script tend to be diligent savers, worry about financial security, and may be overly cautious in their financial decisions.

=== Relational money disorders ===
Relational money disorders include financial infidelity, financial enabling and financial dependency.

- Financial infidelity is a term used to describe a situation in a romantic or marital relationship where one partner engages in secretive or deceptive financial activities, concealing information about their financial status, debts, assets, or spending behaviors from their significant other. This deception can encompass various actions, including the accumulation of hidden debts, opening undisclosed financial accounts, not disclosing additional sources of income, excessive spending without the partner's knowledge, financial dishonesty, and, in extreme cases, embezzlement or misappropriation of shared resources.
- The consequences of financial infidelity often involve a breakdown in trust and communication within the relationship, leading to conflicts and strains. In some cases, it can lead to the dissolution of the relationship. Furthermore, financial infidelity can have lasting financial implications, impacting the financial security and planning of both partners. Addressing and resolving financial infidelity typically necessitates open and honest communication about financial matters and may involve seeking financial counselling or therapy to rebuild trust and work through these challenges.
- Financial enabling, in the context of personal finance and psychology, refers to a behavior in which one individual, often knowingly or unknowingly, supports or encourages another person's unhealthy or irresponsible financial habits. This support can take various forms, such as providing financial assistance, bailing the person out of financial problems, or not holding them accountable for their financial choices. Financial enabling can hinder the individual with financial challenges from taking responsibility for their actions and can perpetuate their financial difficulties. It often stems from well-intentioned efforts to help but can ultimately exacerbate the underlying issues.
- Financial dependency, within the realm of personal finance and psychology, is a situation in which one person becomes reliant on another individual or entity for financial support, often to an extent that hinders their ability to manage their own finances independently. This dependence can result in an imbalance of power and control within the financial relationship.

== Money disorder psychopathology ==
=== Pathological gambling ===
Pathological gambling, as it relates to money disorders, can be defined as a compulsive and destructive pattern of behavior where individuals engage in excessive and uncontrollable gambling activities, often to the detriment of their financial well-being and personal life. This behavior is characterized by a persistent urge to gamble, an inability to control or stop gambling, and continued gambling despite negative consequences.

People affected by pathological gambling may risk substantial sums of money, incur significant debts, and jeopardize their financial stability due to their gambling activities. The emotional and psychological toll can also be severe, leading to increased stress, anxiety, depression, and strained relationships.

=== Hoarding ===
Hoarding, within the context of money disorders, can be described as a financial behavior characterized by an excessive and compulsive accumulation of money, assets, or possessions beyond what is necessary for practical purposes. This behavior often results from deep-rooted emotional or psychological factors, such as a fear of financial scarcity or a need for emotional security through material possessions.

Individuals with hoarding tendencies may have difficulty letting go of money or possessions, even when they are no longer useful or have lost value. This behavior can lead to financial clutter, disorganization, and difficulties in managing their finances effectively. Confronting hoarding with therapy/counseling helps individuals gain control over their compulsive hoarding behaviors, reduce financial clutter, and develop healthier financial habits.

=== Compulsive spending ===
Compulsive spending, when considered within the framework of money disorders, can be described as an irresistible and problematic pattern of excessive and impulsive spending behavior. Individuals affected by this condition often engage in frequent and uncontrolled spending, leading to financial difficulties and emotional distress.

This behavior is characterized by a persistent urge to make purchases, an inability to resist the temptation to spend, and continued spending despite adverse financial consequences. Compulsive spending can result in mounting debts, financial instability, and a negative impact on one's overall financial well-being.

Treatment aims to help individuals regain control over their spending impulses, and explore the underlying emotional and psychological factors that drive compulsive spending. The goal is to improve their financial situation and overall quality of life while addressing the root causes of this behavior.

== Symptoms ==
Signs and symptoms that can show and lead to money disorders range depending on the specific areas of financial beliefs and behavioral patterns that are affected. People with money disorders often don't realize that they are in that state or that they need help. And for those who know their state, they typically find it hard to change their behaviors. Some try to shift their behaviors but are unable to make the changes long-lasting. The result is that most of these people feel ashamed of their behaviors and hide them from others, hence making it difficult for them to get help as needed.

Money disorders may include physical symptoms such as:

- Stress
- Headaches
- Loss of sleep
- High blood pressure
- Anxiety
- Depression
- Worsening of chronic conditions
- Suicidal thoughts

== Treatment ==
Treatment for money disorders encompasses a multifaceted approach that combines psychological, financial, and behavioral interventions. The primary objective is to address the root causes of the disorder and promote healthier financial habits. Here are some common strategies employed in the treatment of money disorders:

- Cognitive-behavioral therapy is a widely utilized therapeutic method that focuses on identifying and challenging negative thought patterns and behaviors related to money. This approach collaborates with individuals to cultivate more positive financial attitudes, beliefs, and actions.
- Financial counseling - Financial counselors and financial therapists offer valuable guidance in areas such as budgeting, debt management, and financial planning. They collaborate with individuals to construct personalized financial plans and impart practical money management skills.
- Debt management programs - Those grappling with money disorders linked to debt may benefit from enrolling in debt management programs. These programs often involve negotiations with creditors to establish manageable repayment arrangements.
- Financial education - Gaining knowledge about personal finance, budgeting, and investment strategies empowers individuals to make informed financial decisions. Access to financial education programs and workshops serves as a valuable resource.
- Family therapy - In cases where money disorders strain family relationships, family therapy can enhance communication and understanding among family members.
- Self-help resources - Books, podcasts, and online materials focusing on financial psychology and money disorders serve as valuable self-improvement tools.

== Further research ==
Although money disorder isn't clinically recognized by the DSM, research is being conducted with time and this disorder may show in the DSM if enough research supports this disorder to be recognized. There is also evidence to suggest that individuals who experience money disorders or disordered money behaviors are also more likely to experience depression related symptoms like increased loneliness, lower self-esteem, and a smaller locus of control. In addition to this, these individuals also routinely report sleep difficulties and poorer health generally.

== See also ==
- Attention deficit hyperactivity disorder
- Bipolar mania
- Compulsive buying
- Compulsive gambling
- Compulsive shopping
- Executive dysfunction
- Greed
- Impulse-control disorder
- Intellectual disability
- Lifestyle disease
