= Shopping addiction =

Obsession with shopping and buying behavior

Shopping addiction is characterized by an eagerness to purchase unnecessary or superfluous things and a lack of impulse control when it comes to shopping. It is a concept similar to compulsive buying disorder (oniomania), but usually has a more psychosocial perspective, or is viewed as a drug-free addiction like addiction to gambling, Internet, or video games. However, there is "still debate on whether other less recognized forms of impulsive behaviors, such as compulsive buying [...] can be conceptualized as addictions."

== Behavioural manifestations ==
There are three kinds of behavioural manifestations of shopping addiction, with different repercussions. These can be displayed together or independently and in more or less intense ways. Nevertheless, they are closely related and appear joined in people who seriously suffer from this disorder.

First is the attraction towards the consumer stimulus, which is the addiction to purchasing as a leisure activity. This is about the uncontrolled and excessive draw to use shopping as a leisure activity, usually in an exclusive and overwhelming way. While activities such as window shopping, visiting shops or spending time in commercial centres is a common and socially accepted desire activity, an addict is differentiated as one in whom this excessive attraction to purchase interferes with the normal development of life and damages their relationships with others, becoming an obsessive and uncontrolled activity.

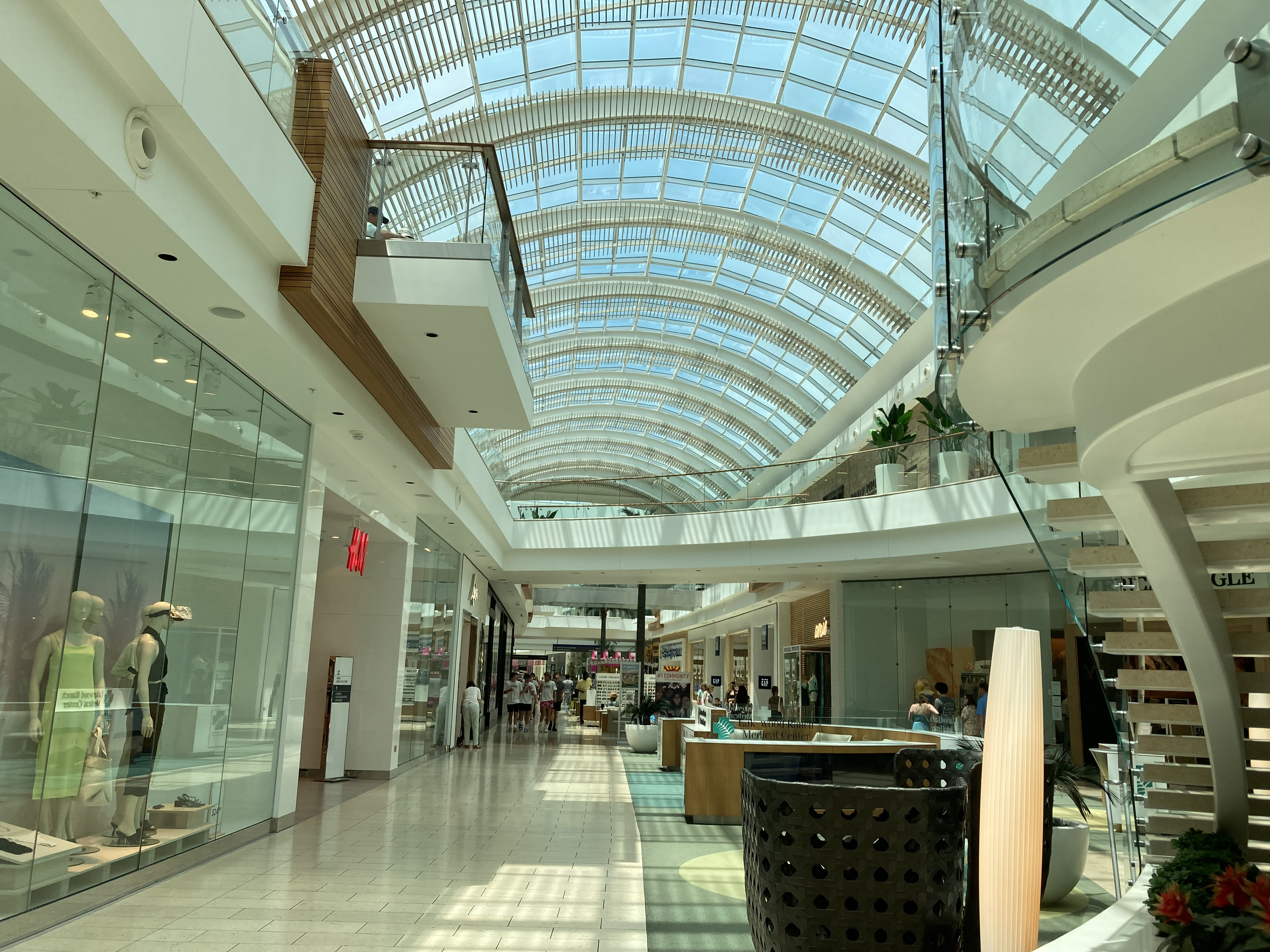
Huge malls become places to stay and ramble, show the use of shopping as a leisure activity.

Although shopping addiction and compulsive purchase are conceptually different, they are interrelated and both are manifestations of the same problem: the lack of self-control when buying and to restrain impulses. Shopping addiction is understood as the eagerness for constantly making new purchases of unnecessary or superfluous things. The concept of compulsive purchase is related to the psychological process which causes many people not to be able to control their impulses and wishes of buying, and subjects them to reflexion and evaluation before purchasing. A basic behavioural characteristic of people who have serious problems of consumer addiction is that their purchases are unnecessary and unsatisfactory. Addicts may feel pleasure or relief when they give in to the shopping wish, but regret it afterwards. In cases of people with severe problems of shopping addiction, this remorse can lead to very deep feelings of blame and discomfort.

Lack of economic self-control: this is the serious and permanent inability to adjust the habits of spending to the economic means of the individual. This is not about one's ordinary or unexpected spending making life difficult, but is an absolute inability to control the personal or family income in a rational way, and to discipline their buying, no matter how superfluous it is. A manifestation of this lack of control is usually the excessive use of indebtedness. The final result is the active or “guilty” over-indebtedness; this is derived from the improper behaviour of the consumer.

== Impact on the general population ==
The rate of people who have problems of shopping addiction is a very controversial matter, because the dividing line between pathological behaviours and those behaviours which, even if excessive, are socially accepted, is very difficult to determine. However, shopping addiction and other manifestations of the lack of self-control on spending are widespread problems which are constantly expanding. Studies using samples of the general population show that between 8% and 16% of the people have problems with excessive or uncontrolled purchases. Clinical studies give much lower figures, however, between 2% and 5%. According to the European Report on the programme for the prevention and treatment of personal problems related to consumer addiction, personal purchasing habits and over-indebtedness, 3% of European adults and 8% of European young people have a level of shopping addiction which could be considered as pathologic, that is, which seriously affects the life of the people who suffer from this. Other estimates for the prevalence of compulsive buying range from a low of 2 percent to 12 percent or more (in the U.S. population.

Most of people who have these problems neither receive nor ask for treatment. Those that ask for help only do it after years of suffering, when the addiction has caused very serious economic repercussion and has harmed the relationship with their family and social environment. For this reason and due to the lack of social consciousness about this problem, the unrecorded figure of people who suffer from these problems is very high. In addition to the severe cases of shopping addiction, an important part of consumers (between 30% and 50% of the population) have deficiencies with spending self-control or excessive purchases. According to the European Report, 33% of European adults and 46% of the European young people have minor or moderate problems with shopping addiction or lack of economic self-control.

=== COVID-19 ===
The amount of shopping among Millennials, Gen Z, and Gen X consumers increased during and after Covid-19. These generations are inclined to current trends of technology platforms like TikTok among others serve and they offer a place for consumers to follow and buy advertising products of their choice. During COVID-19, consumers purchased products that they might not need but because of boredom without thinking about the financial implications of their actions. Research carried out among 100 millennial consumers to test their shopping behavior using primary data found that a majority of millennial generation consumers prefer to use online shopping platforms to purchase their brands, due to both pricing and the responsiveness of manufacturers. Their purchasing behavior is defined by impulsive trend-driven purchases, particularly during the Covid-19 pandemic, with online platforms now having a 60% influence on current consumption trends. Many purchase decisions were driven by fear of shortages due to the pandemic.

== Relationships with other disorders ==
The relationship of shopping addiction with other psychological disorders – especially with those regarding depression or anxiety - has been studied. This addiction has also been related with low self-esteem and with personality features such as impulsivity, materialism and hedonism.

Depression problems are the most frequent consequence in the most serious cases of shopping addiction. This is due to the fact that many consumers use shopping as a means to compensate or to face depressive states. Edwards (1992) in a research to study the influence of some personal variables in two groups, one of shopping addicts and another of non-addict consumers, came to the conclusion that depression is a trigger for shopping addiction problems. In agreement with this data, other researchers have pointed out the high incidence rate of depressive disorders among shopping addicts: Mc.Elloy (1994) placed at 25% the rate of addicts with depressive problems, Lejoyeux (1998) at 61%, and Black, Montaban and Gabel (1997) at 60%. More recent research shows that shopping addicts usually have feelings of leading an unsatisfactory and listless life, without any hope or excitement. In these cases, by means of purchase, the addicts seek for a way of escape, a satisfaction, even if momentary to compensate and to bear the depressive feelings.

Cole (1995) carried out research with a sample of 420 people and come to the conclusion that anxiety has an essential role in shopping addiction, as an antecedent or a triggering factor. In another study, Valence (1988) revealed that as the level of anxiety rises, the possibility of developing shopping addiction grows. Clinical research on the rate incidence of anxiety disorders in shopping addition also shows this relationship, although the percentage changes a lot: Shlosser (1994) 42%; McElroy (1994) 80%, and Christenson (1994) 50%. Research carried out by Garcés and Salcedo in 2005, based on a sample of 253 young people, concluded that the anxiety trait has a significant influence on shopping addiction but, by itself, is not determinant.

== Population differences ==
=== Gender ===
A higher rate of incidence of shopping addiction in women was pointed out in the first research works on the subject, so much so that it was considered a “women problem”. Some researchers thought that this was a specifically female manifestation of problems of depression or obsessive-compulsive disorders. Others, from a psychoanalyst point of view, thought that it was a problem very similar to kleptomania and they related it to sexual repression to explain the high rate of incidence in women. Research carried out in the last century confirmed this difference, although disagreeing on the scope. Other hypotheses have been stated to explain these differences. For example, people more easily develop addictions to behaviours they normally undertake and most home purchasing is still done by women. Since shopping is for many women one of their most usual activities, as obligation or as entertainment, it easily becomes an important mechanism of escape, facing other problems and ending up being an addiction. Another possible cause is that the most striking cases of shopping excesses are usually related to clothes, shoes, cosmetics and accessories, products which relate to physical appearance and are more frequently bought by women. The excessive purchase of other products such as electronic, computer or D.I.Y ones, accessories of cars, etc., that are frequently done by men usually goes unnoticed. This appraisal has been confirmed by research on different products bought by addicted women and men. Several studies (Flaber, O´Guin and Krych in 1987, Scherhorn 1990, and McElroy in 1994), agree that women spend more on clothes, footwear, perfumes and, in general terms, men tend to spend more on sports equipment, car accessories and electronic products. The 1999 European Report established that women are drawn by activities like going shopping or window shopping, spending time in malls, escorting other people shopping. Moreover, they more frequently use shopping as a means of facing states of sadness, depression or downheartedness. However, the Report does not indicate significant differences between men and women related to economic self-control or impulsive purchase.

=== Age ===
Research carried out on people undergoing treatment, as well as on the general population has revealed a negative correlation between age and addiction. As the age of people increases there is a lower number of shopping addicts. These data were confirmed by the 1999 European Report. The age of diagnosis is much later than the age when the problems of addiction begin. Most addicts have the first symptoms of addiction in their twenties, but do not ask for help nor accept treatment until more than ten years afterwards. To explain the higher incidence of shopping addiction in young people, it has been shown that younger people have been born, and have grown up, in an increasingly consumerist society and they have endured the impact of publicity and marketing from birth. On the contrary, it is very unusual to find shopping addiction problems in people older than 65 years.

== Different theoretical approaches ==
Clinical approach: since ancient times, cases of people who bought in an uncontrolled way have been described, but the first relevant references to shopping addiction appear in the beginning of the twentieth century with Kraepelin and Bleuler. They analysed cases of people, usually women, who were not able to control their excess of purchasing and they considered this behaviour to be a symptom of other psychological diseases: depression, obsessive compulsive disorder, problems with control of impulses, etc. The clinical approach is also followed by the psychoanalytic theories that interpreted this behaviour as close to kleptomania and these would be manifestations of internal conflicts. Until the 1980s, this clinical approach was the predominant one in psychology and psychiatry. Shopping addiction was considered an individual disorder of impulse control or obsessive compulsive disorder, and its higher incidence rate in women and its relations with depression problems were emphasised.

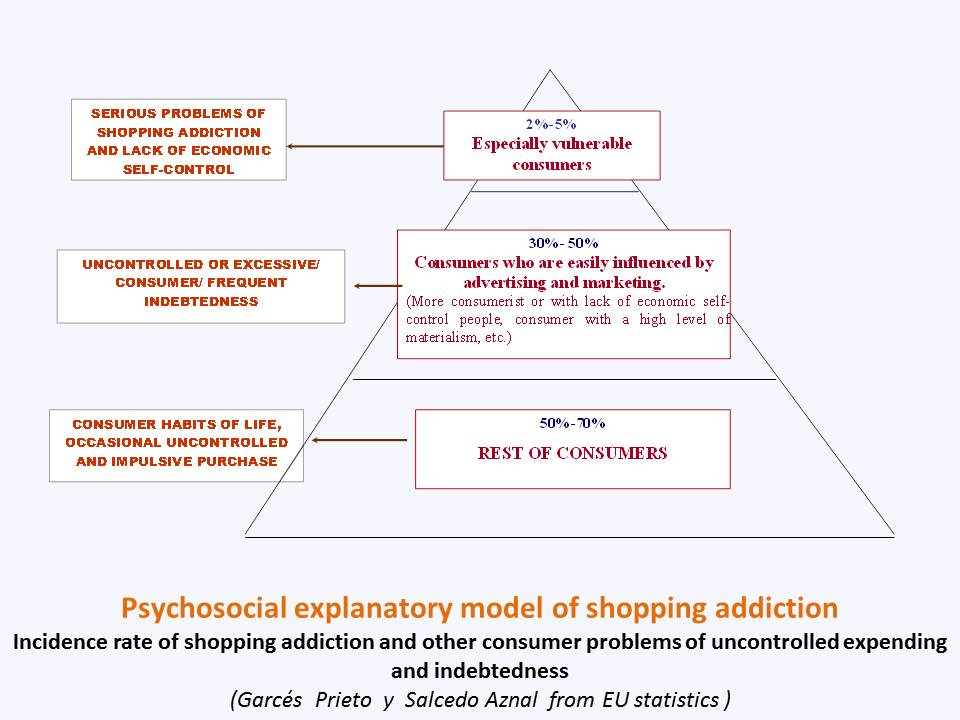

Psychosocial approach : Since the 1980s a significant increase in the number of people with important problems of lack of control in shopping and spending has been established. Given the fact that this increase was parallel with the spreading of the values and behaviour of the consumer society, these disorders started to be considered as an individual manifestation of a general social problem. A model taking this approach was one by Javier Garcés and Alejandro Saucedo, who regard shopping addiction as "the tip of the iceberg” that is, the most intense manifestation of a general problem which affects, to a greater or lesser extent, a great deal of the population. The behaviour differences between the average consumer and the shopping addict are more quantitative than qualitative. Advertising and commercial influences, which cause in some people serious problems of shopping addiction or excessive indebtedness, also contribute to excessive consumer behaviour in many others. This model is graphically described by the “consumerist pyramid”. Another model is the one defended by Helga Ditmar, which could be classified as a mixed model, since she considers that shopping addiction problems are caused by the conjunction of two factors: a high level of materialism and a high discrepancy between the real self-concept (how the person sees themselves) and the ideal self-concept (how the person wishes to see themselves).

Shopping addiction as a drug-free addiction or as a social addiction: In this theoretical perspective, not incompatible with the previous approaches, shopping addiction is usually included among the so-called “drug-free addictions”, such as addiction to gambling and, specifically, within a number of addictions grouped together as social addictions such as the addiction to Internet, video-games or mobile-phones.

== Diagnosis ==
Since people buying more than they need is usual and accepted, even the most excessive behaviour takes a long time before being considered pathological. Shopping addiction generally manifests between 20–30 years old, but is not usually detected until several years after, when the addiction has led the person to ruin and bankruptcy.

There are usually two stages in coping with the problem. First, people around the addict or the health or social services detect the problem and try to treat it. When, because of the seriousness of the case, it is not possible to solve it in this way, specialised professionals, such as psychologist or psychiatrics, take part. The diagnosis and evaluation of shopping addiction is based on the analysis of confirmed behaviours and their consequences. Specific tests or questionnaires, as the FACC-II (Questionnaire on the psychological aspects of consumer addiction, debt and personal spending habits) are also used. These specific questionnaires or tests are useful in the diagnosis and evaluation of shopping addiction problems, and to drive the therapies in a proper way. FACC-II is one of the most specific and widest. The Edwards Scale is another approach which measures the tendency to compulsively buy. All these resources, as well as personal interviews of the addict and people who surround them, reports and other documents, enable knowledge of when people buy, what they buy and the methods of payment used. Signs of addiction can include: planning future purchases, unable to stop the urge of shopping, rush of dopamine when buying, regretful after purchased items, financial issues begin, and buying unnecessary items.

== Treatment ==
=== Pharmacological treatment ===
The inclusion of this problem in the obsessive-compulsive disorders and its relation with depression has led to some use of antidepressants as a treatment. Within antidepressant drugs, special attention has been paid to those related to serotonin, a brain neurotransmitter. This substance is supposed to be related to deficiencies in stimulus control, so that medicines like fluoxetine and fluvoxamine, which raise the level of serotonin in the brain, would be a pharmacological alternative to treat shopping addiction. Even though results are not conclusive, in the nineties some research was carried out which supported the effectiveness of these treatments, at least in certain cases.

=== Behaviour therapy ===
The treatment of shopping addiction – in contrast to other addictions as the gambling, alcohol or smoking - cannot seek to permanently remove the addicts from the behaviour. After therapy, they must be able to face consumer stimuli which surround them and maintain self-control. Because of this, the most usual therapies are behavioural ones., especially stimuli control and exposure and response prevention.

=== Guardianship ===
In the treatment of shopping addiction it is often very useful for other people – usually friends, relatives or educators -to help addicts control their expenses and impulsive purchases. In these cases, addicts have to accept that all their money, credit cards, bank accounts, etc., will be controlled by the guardian. This person becomes their “voluntary guardian”. It is possible that the addict has also to accept not to go alone to stores and other limitations, even legal.

=== Self-registration techniques ===
Self-registration techniques involve addicts noting down their activities to be able to remember and analyse them. This can range from a simple personal accountability of income and expenses, in the cases of minor economic lack of control, to a detailed diary of purchase, events and feelings, in the more serious cases of shopping addiction. Self-registration is useful to get clues about the behaviour, which could otherwise go unnoticed to the addicts themselves. Moreover, it is, in itself, a therapeutic means that helps addicts understand and reflect on their behaviour. These techniques are effective in improving economic self-control and avoiding impulsive purchase and are generally included, one way or another, in all programmes of treatment.

=== Self-help groups and group therapy ===
Some experiences of self-help groups and group therapy have been carried out in a very similar way to those used in other addictions. Preliminary evidence suggests that group for compulsive shoppers could be effective.

== Gear acquisition syndrome (G.A.S.) ==
Since the 1990s, the acronym G.A.S. (gear acquisition syndrome) has been used in internet forums and magazines for musicians, audio engineers and photographers to denote compulsive accumulation of technical equipment. The acronym was coined by Steely Dan guitarist Walter Becker in a 1994 satirical Guitar Player magazine column titled "The Dreaded G.A.S." Describing a fellow guitarist's family room covered entirely with guitars, Becker speaks of "guitar acquisition syndrome":

You undoubtedly know someone who has it. Reading this rag, you probably have it yourself. Or will have it someday soon or would like to have it. You may think it's cool. But it's not cool. Not anymore. How many Strats do you need to be happy? How many Strat copies, each extensively modified to be able to produce the variations in tone that once would have required maybe four different guitars? How many knobs and switches does that Strat need?

The acronym "G.A.S." was used on internet forums subsequently, replacing "guitar" with "gear". A musicological study published in 2017 conducted an online survey among 418 electric guitar players inquiring their affliction with "G.A.S." The study finds the main reason for compulsive gear acquisition among musicians to be the quest for stylistic flexibility. "Gear acquisition syndrome" has been called an example of commodity fetishism.

== See also ==
- Consumerism
- Compulsive buying disorder
- Compulsive behavior
- Bergen Shopping Addiction Scale
- Dopamine agonist

== Bibliography ==
- April Lane Benson, "To Buy or Not to Buy: Why We Overshop and How to Stop" Massachusetts 2008 (English)
- April Lane Benson (2013): "Amanda: An Overshopper's Recovery Story", Journal of Groups in Addiction & Recovery, 8:1, 25-35
- Donald W Black, "A review of compulsive buying disorder" Official Journal of the World Psychiatric Association (WPA) World Psychiatry. 2007 Feb; 6(1): 14–18.
- Tatiana Zambrano; Filomensky, Hermano Tavares, "Compulsive Buying Disorder" - Textbook of Addiction Treatment: 2015; pp 1527–1542"
- Garcés Prieto, Javier, "Self-help and information manual: Addiction to shopping:self-control and responsibility in shopping and spending" European Interregional Institute for Consumer Affairs. European Commission. (English, Spanish and Italian version).
- Holman Coombs, Robert "Addictive Disorders: A Practical Guide to Diagnosis and Treatment".
- Jeffrey Powell "Shopping Addiction: A Cure for Compulsive Shopping and Spending" (English)
- Palací Descals, Salcedo Aznal and Ruiz Marín. "El comportamiento del Consumidor en la Sociedad Actual (Consumer behavior in current society". Publisher: Sanz y Torres. Madrid 2008. (Spanish).
- Rodríguez Villarino, Otero-López y Rodríguez Castro. “Adicción a la Compra: análisis, evolución y tratamiento”. Editorial Piramide. 2001 (Spanish)
