= Chigyu =

Japanese internet slang

Original, generic appearance of Chigyu, saying "Excuse me, could I have a special large serving of the three cheese beef bowl with a hot spring egg on top, please?"

Chiizu gyudon (Japanese: チーズ牛丼, Hepburn: Chīzu gyūdon; lit. 'Cheese beef bowl'), or simply Chigyu (Japanese: チー牛, Hepburn: Chī gyū) is a Japanese internet slang term used to refer to so-called "otaku", and "uncool", "introverted" and "gloomy" people. It is always regarded as a taunt and term of abuse.

== Character ==
A chigyu is described as "a somewhat disgusting otaku" or "a gloomy character with little sense of presence". The slang mainly refers to gloomy males, but is sometimes also used to refer to females with similar personalities.

The characteristics of a chigyu include wearing glasses, having a "childish hairstyle", "not a domineering face", childlike appearance, spiritually childish, "although active online, appears gloomy in reality". Besides, the chigyu has also been used to refer to the appearance similar to individuals with developmental disabilities or enlarged adenoids.

The Paper analyzed how the "childishness" of chigyu "violates the ideal definition of adult male's 'masculinity' in society", and how the image of chigyu shows a gloomy person in a lower social class who lacks socialization. It described chigyu as a discriminatory term towards gender, body, and class. The meme has attracted criticism, viewed as an example of lookism.

== History ==
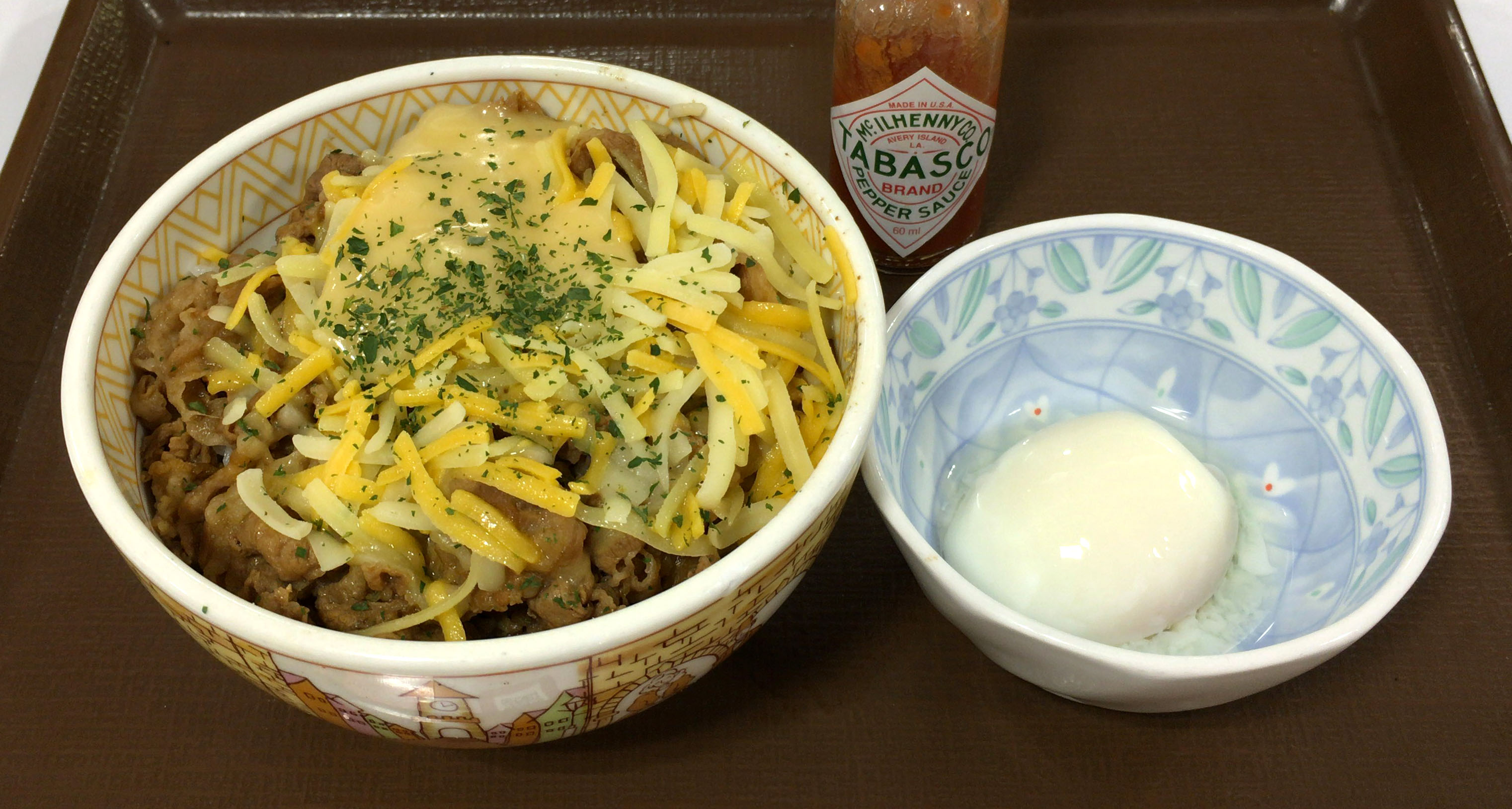
Cheese beef bowl with soft-boiled egg

In 2008, the doujinshi artist "ibiryo" drew a self portrait as a high school student and uploaded it to his blog, which later became the generic appearance of chigyu. Some have traced the origin of the term "chigyu" to a 2018 thread on 5channel, which used this illustration to represent participants of employment transition support programs, describing them as creepy for "all having the same face" and for looking like middle schoolers despite being adults, while also making a connection to developmental disabilities. The thread has received a lot of responses, with most responders claiming that "there are indeed people around who look like this and say that", and other discussion boards have also shown related discussions. In April 2019, a summary website reprinted a related discussion thread, making the term chigyu more widely spread. In June 2019, three different styles of chigyu illustrations (samurai, juvenile delinquent, and ikemen) were shared online. On C97, a male cosplayed as a chigyu.

In April 2020, there were an average of 500–1000 tweets per day mentioning the term "Chiizu Gyudon", while there were an average of 100 tweets mentioning "Chigyu" per day. By June, the average number of tweets mentioning "Chigyu" per day had reached 10000.

== Reception ==
=== Gyūdon chain stores ===
In June 2020, Japanese news website J-CAST News interviewed Zensho Holdings, which runs Sukiya, about this slang. The company's publicity department responded "Of course we know what chigyu is. That's our top popular product No.1, 'Gyudon with 3 Cheeses'. We hope our customers will continue to enjoy our products in the future. We will launch a new product, 'Cheese Beef Rib Gyudon', and welcome everyone to try it out in person." Disability information collection website shohgaisha.com pointed J-CAST News' report did not mention the relationship between 'chigyu' and individuals with developmental disabilities, instead introducing it as just a meme that mocks dull men to avoid stirring up controversy. The website also thought Sukiya actually knew the meaning of "chigyu", but due to fear of online debates, it shifted the focus to new products.

=== Buzzword award ===
The term Chiizu Gyudon was nominated for the Internet Buzzword Award 2020, and won third place at the Instagram Buzzword Award 2020.

=== Application ===
Hong Kong activist Joshua Wong was known by Japanese netizens as the "chigyu around Agnes Chow" due to his resemblance to the generic appearance of chigyu. Wong responded positively to this, and fellow activist Chow said that Wong was "very happy about it and didn't take it to heart at all". Wong later collaborated with a restaurant selling cheese beef bowls which were named after him.

On 28 July 2020, during the live broadcast of the Puyo Puyo Championships, Toshihiro Nagoshi commented on the entrants, saying that they "look like they like to eat chiizu gyudon," sparking controversy. Sega deleted the live playback on YouTube and re-uploaded it after removing the "unpleasant parts". Host Ayana Tsubaki apologized on Twitter.

== See also ==
- Incel
- Neckbeard
- Wojak
  - NPC (meme)
