= Soyjak =

Internet memes pertaining to soy boys

- Variations of the Soyjak. From top left: Soyak, Bernd, Gapejak, Smugjak, Feraljak, Meximutt, Impish Soyak Ears, Markiplier Soyjak, and Cobson.
- First appearance: 4chan, /int/; December 30, 2017
- Created by: The Swede
- Based on: Wojak; Soy boy

Soyjaks are a group of Internet memes that are black and white drawings depicting the soy boy stereotype, sometimes described as having an "MS Paint style." They are usually made by tracing over an existing photo and giving it "soy boy" qualities. These typically include a bald head, thick-rimmed glasses, a neckbeard, and a gaping mouth. These drawings are then used as templates for further editing. They originated in 2017 as an edit of the Wojak used to mock the "soy boy-like" or "neckbeard-like" traits attributed to the person the poster is replying to. On September 20, 2020, an imageboard dedicated to the posting of these memes named soyjak.party was created by a 4chan user known as "Soot".

== History ==
The first Soyjak meme was created on 4chan's "International" (/int/) board in December 2017 by a user known as "The Swede". The character was a version of the Wojak with nu-male features, getting excited about a Nintendo Switch in front of him. (Note: This version is commonly referred to as the "Soyak" by the Soyjak community.) It gained popularity as people started editing him to appear excited about other products, such as Rick and Morty DVDs and soy milk. These memes were made to satirize the left-wing for their "effeminate behavior" and "geeky pastimes".

The character was often paired with the Chad, another meme that is based on the "chad" stereotype. A reaction image with the two went viral as users posited the Soyjak's position as their opponent's and the Chad's position as their own. Eventually, users started satirizing the meme itself for being commonly used as a thought-terminating cliché, with users making memes where popular villains say they have already drawn the hero as the Soyjak and themselves as the Chad.

As the meme developed, Soyjaks stopped following the Wojak template and started being traced off of real people, such as Andrew Tate and Elon Musk. Some internet users have also used the meme to express their own enthusiasm.

== Variations ==
=== Fell for It Again Award ===
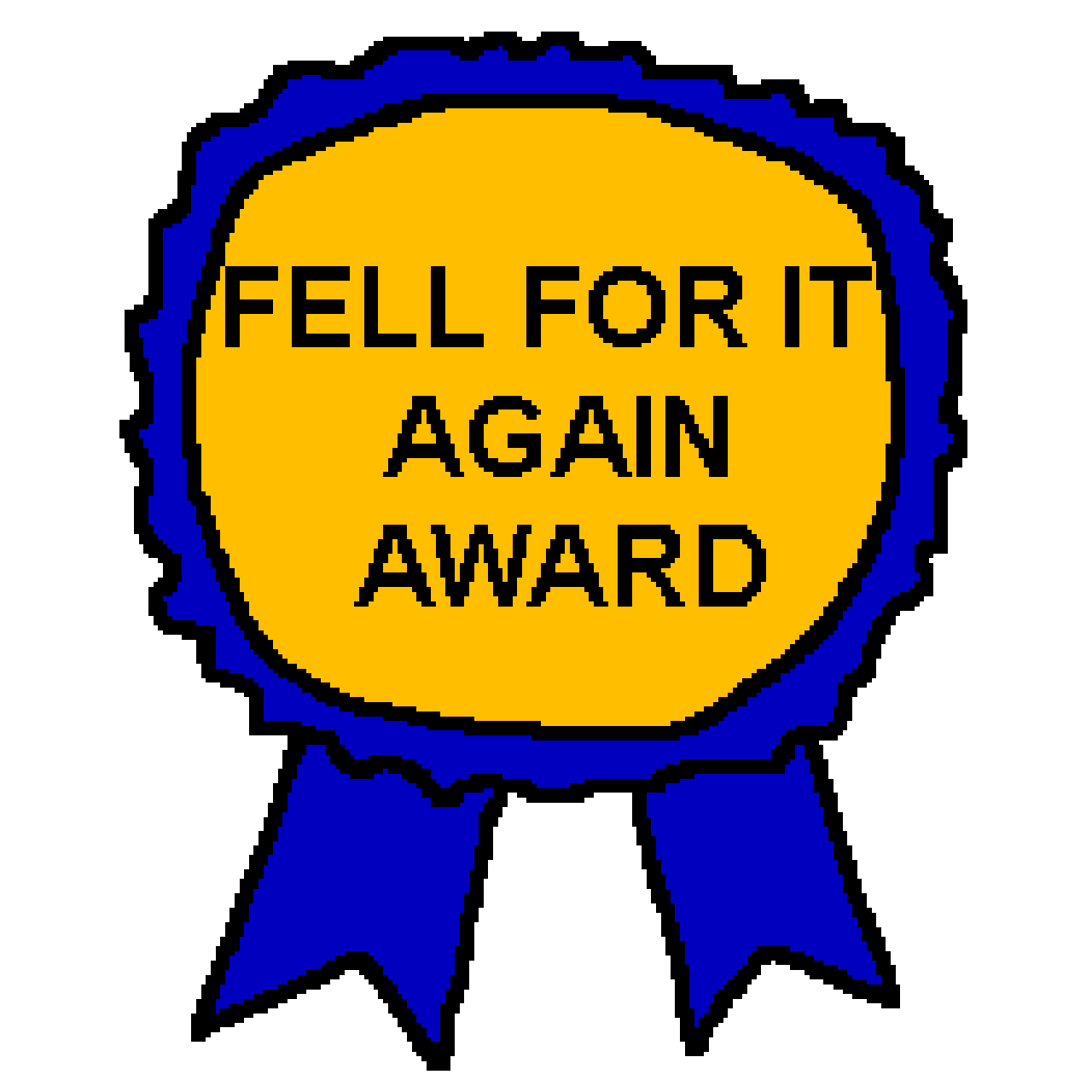
The Fell for It Again Award

The Fell for It Again Award is a subvariant of the award ribbon, which is a blue rosette ribbon with a yellow circular center that has the text "___ award" on it. The meme was originally posted on April 16, 2023, on SoyBooru, a Soyjak-themed booru site. A subvariant of the Soyak wearing the ribbon and a Make America Great Again (MAGA) hat became a popular meme on X in late 2024 to mock Trump supporters who were negatively affected by his second presidency.

=== Two Soyjaks Pointing ===
Two Soyjaks Pointing is a variant that depicts two Soyjaks gawking at the camera, with one pointing behind himself. It was drawn from a photo attached to a tweet by animal rights advocate John Oberg in which he praises KFC for adding Beyond Meat items to their menu. The meme went viral in 2020 as people began editing the meme to appear as if they were gawking at something in the background and redrawing different characters doing the pose.

=== Serious Hat ===
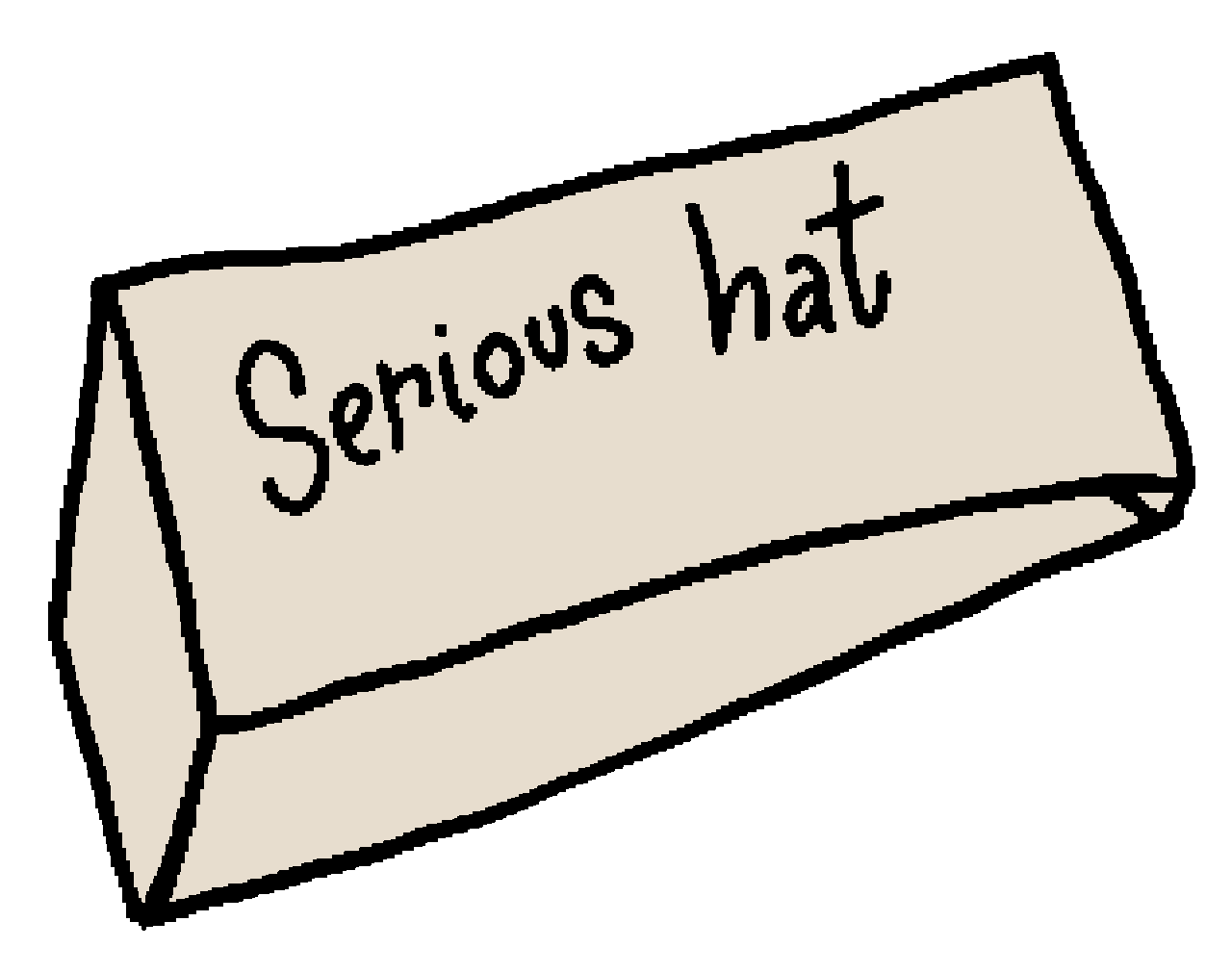
The Serious Hat

The Serious Hat is a box-shaped, beige hat with its name on the front. It is edited onto the top of a Soyjak's head to satirize people who are "too serious online". It was originally made in 2022 by DeviantArt user SoyGemArt.

=== Troonjak ===
Troonjak, also known as Trannyjak or Troonella, is a transphobic subvariant named after the slur troon. A common version of the meme has the character depicted as the Bernd variant committing suicide via hanging to mock the high suicide attempt rate of transgender people. The meme originated from 4chan's /qa/ board.

=== Impish Soyak Ears ===
Impish Soyak Ears, also known as Impjak, is a variant with large ears, a shrunken forehead, a large face, and a double chin. He is a heavily edited version of the Gapejak, who is drawn from Bernd Schmidt, the former Guinness World Record holder for "largest mouth gape." He was also created by The Swede, the original creator of Soyjaks. The character was additionally used in a popular meme named "Dancing Swede," in which he dances to the credits theme from Super Mario World. A shock video version of this meme intended to bait users into clicking it was created by a Turkish man named Itil Amin, known online as "Goth," where it immediately cuts to a piece of child sexual abuse material upon start. Goth would later be doxxed and arrested for posting this content online.

=== Cobson ===
Cobson is a variant with thick eyebrows, white irises, and a "somewhat smoother drawing style" when compared to other Soyjaks. He spread primarily on soyjak.party and has become a base for multiple subvariants. The variant has been described as having a "community-specific feel" and "visual identity strong enough to be recognisable on its own."

=== Smugjak ===
Smugjak is a variant with a large nose and oval-shaped eyes looking at the camera with a smug expression. He was traced from the character Tighten from Megamind, specifically when he gets punched in the face by the titular character. He was originally posted to soyjak.party on January 10th, 2023 and gained popularity on the Russian internet. In the anglosphere, he is commonly paired with the phrase, "But how does this affect you personally?", but is commonly paired with "Жаль, что далеко не все поймут" ("It's a pity that not everyone will understand") in Russia.

== Soyjak.party ==
The logo of the website

Soyjak.party, (Note: The site is named after the old URL. The current URL of the website is Soyjak.st, with the URL changing in 2023 to the official domain of the country São Tomé and Principe.) nicknamed "The Sharty", is an imageboard dedicated to the Soyjak meme. It was created by 4chan user Soot in September of 2020, with it originally having only 4 boards, /soy/ (dedicated to Soyjaks), /a/ (dedicated to Anime), /qa/ (based off of 4chan’s /qa/, which became the de-facto home for Soyjaks) and /suggest/ (dedicated to suggestions). It gained popularity in 2021 after /qa/, 4chan's question-and-answer board, was removed from the site due to raids on the /lgbt/ board. In a later blog post on Blogger, Soot stated the forum was "intended to be a joke" and that he didn't expect it to be "such a popular gathering place". He would later sell the site in 2022 to an individual known online as "Kuz", who would own the site for a year before selling it to Froot, an Italian.

Users of the site often participate in the creation of new Soyjak memes and variants, colloquially known as 'jakking (or soyjakking), and often engage in a yearly practice known as "Brimstone (Note: A term used to describe “terrible” Soyjaks.) Winter", where users compete to see who can make the best Soyjaks. The website has a large amount of boards, of which the most popular are /soy/, a board dedicated to Soyjaks, and /qa/, a board dedicated to questions and answers. Users also maintain a wiki, which acts as an encyclopedia for Soyjak variants and soyjak.party relevant topics and site history, and a booru named "SoyBooru" for hosting Soyjak images. Soyjak.party has been said to be "the origin point for some of the most popular Soyjaks" but has "gone uncredited" when content from it spreads to sites such as X and Reddit.

=== Controversies ===
The imageboard has been described by the Anti-Defamation League as a "reactionary imageboard filled with crude, racist and antisemitic humor." According to the ADL, the perpetrator of the 2025 Antioch High School shooting also made reference to the website in the manifesto he allegedly wrote before carrying out the attack.

On April 14, 2025, a user of the website breached 4chan and leaked its custom source code and the admins' personal information. The previously disabled board, /qa/, was reopened with the message "/qa/ returns, soyjak.party won." Administrators later forced the site to go down at 10:30 pm that day, claiming it would "not be up for some time." In a post on soyjak.party, an anonymous user referred to the hacking of "4Cuck" as the "true Operation Soyclipse" (Note: Operation Soyclipse was a previous failed attempt at raiding 4chan back in 2022.) and that it was a "cathartic night" for "nuteens (Note: A new user. Users of soyjak.party are commonly known as "soyteens" within the community.), the last oldGODs (Note: Veteran or longstanding users of the site), and everyone in between." 4chan went back up on April 25, with a post on the site stating, "No other website can replace it, or this community. No matter how hard it is, we are not giving up."

== See also ==
- Chudjak
- NPC
