= Polandball =

Genre of memes and political cartoons

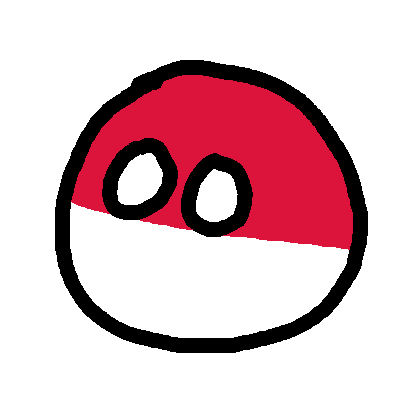
An example of Poland portrayed as a "countryball". The inversion of the Polish flag is intentional.

Polandball, also known as Countryballs, (Note: The terms "Polandball" and "Countryballs" are widely considered interchangeable when referring to the genre.) is an internet meme, genre of geopolitical satire, and Art style . They are primarily used in webcomics and videos in which countries and other political entities are personified as anthropomorphic balls bearing the design of their national flag—these figures are generally referred to as "countryballs". Polandball comics usually feature plots that satirize international relations, historical events, and stereotypes associated with featured countries, and are primarily created with widely available graphic art software such as Microsoft Paint, though comics created with more advanced software are often intentionally made to look crudely drawn.

The name "Polandball" is derived from the comics' origin as a means to troll a Polish user on the image board Krautchan named Wojak, who often spoke in broken English. Notably, in the early comics, Poland was drawn with an upside down Polish flag (resembling the flag of Indonesia or Monaco), which is now considered a defining feature of the genre.

After the initial strips that were focused on Wojak, other users on the board began to create their own comics featuring other countryballs and exploring real-world geopolitical relationships and history. The Polandball meme then spread to other parts of the internet, spawning large communities on social media sites like Facebook and Reddit, while "Countryballs" videos have grown and continue to be popular on YouTube.

== Origins and spread ==
=== Precursors ===
A still frame from "Europe vs. Italy"

Polandball, as noted by the British magazine The Shortlisted, was possibly inspired by the work of Italian animator Bruno Bozzetto. In his 1999 cartoon "Europe vs. Italy", the European Union and Italy are depicted as circles, and the clip highlights the cultural and social differences between Italians and Europeans.

Another possible inspiration for Polandball can be traced back to drawball.com, where users could freely draw on a circular canvas called a "drawball". In August 2009, after coordination by thousands of users from Wykop.pl, PokazyWarka, and various other Polish websites, the drawball displayed an illustration of the Polish flag with the word "POLSKA" in the middle. The circular canvas constrained the flag in such a way that it became a literal "Poland ball".

Other users on the website attempted to sabotage the artwork by inverting the colour scheme to match that of a Poké Ball, or defacing it with a large swastika. Later, on 18 August 2009, hackers attacked the websites where the drawball coordination originated; the sites withstood the attacks, but ran considerably slower for the rest of the day.

=== First Polandball comics and spread ===
The first Polandball comics were published on the German imageboard Krautchan by a British user of the site under the name Falco, with the intention of trolling a Polish user called Wojak. The upside down Polish flag was likely an oversight by Falco, however it quickly became a convention employed by other users on Krautchan. Falco's style of irreverent humour, crude drawing, and emphasis on broken English and stereotypes proved popular with other users for the purpose of satirizing countries other than Poland.

When the style eventually began to be shared in other places on the internet outside of Krautchan, with Facebook and Reddit emerging as the two most prominent hubs for Polandball comics and community activity, different ideas of what constitutes "good quality Countryballs content" began to develop according to the unique characteristics of each site.

== Platforms ==
=== Facebook ===
On 11 November 2009, a Facebook page named POLANDBALL was created, reaching over 215,000 likes by July 2015, and it is notable for being one of the earliest major hubs for Polandball comics outside of krautchan.net. Though it was initially dedicated to posting Polandball content in the style of the original krautchan.net comics, the POLANDBALL page became known for sharing comics that deviated from the "standard" Polandball conventions, blending the Polandball style with other memes, and simply posting non-Polandball memes centered around history and geopolitics.

The POLANDBALL page is considered the normative authority for Countryball content on Facebook, however the decentralized nature of the various Countryball pages on Facebook has led to concerns about community conduct. The community centered around the POLANDBALL page is known for its rejection of "politically correct" language in its comments sections, and the "satirical and often disparaging humor" often employed within its content across all associated pages. It is speculated that this led to a series of suspensions for the main POLANDBALL page, and its temporary removal in 2017.

=== Reddit ===
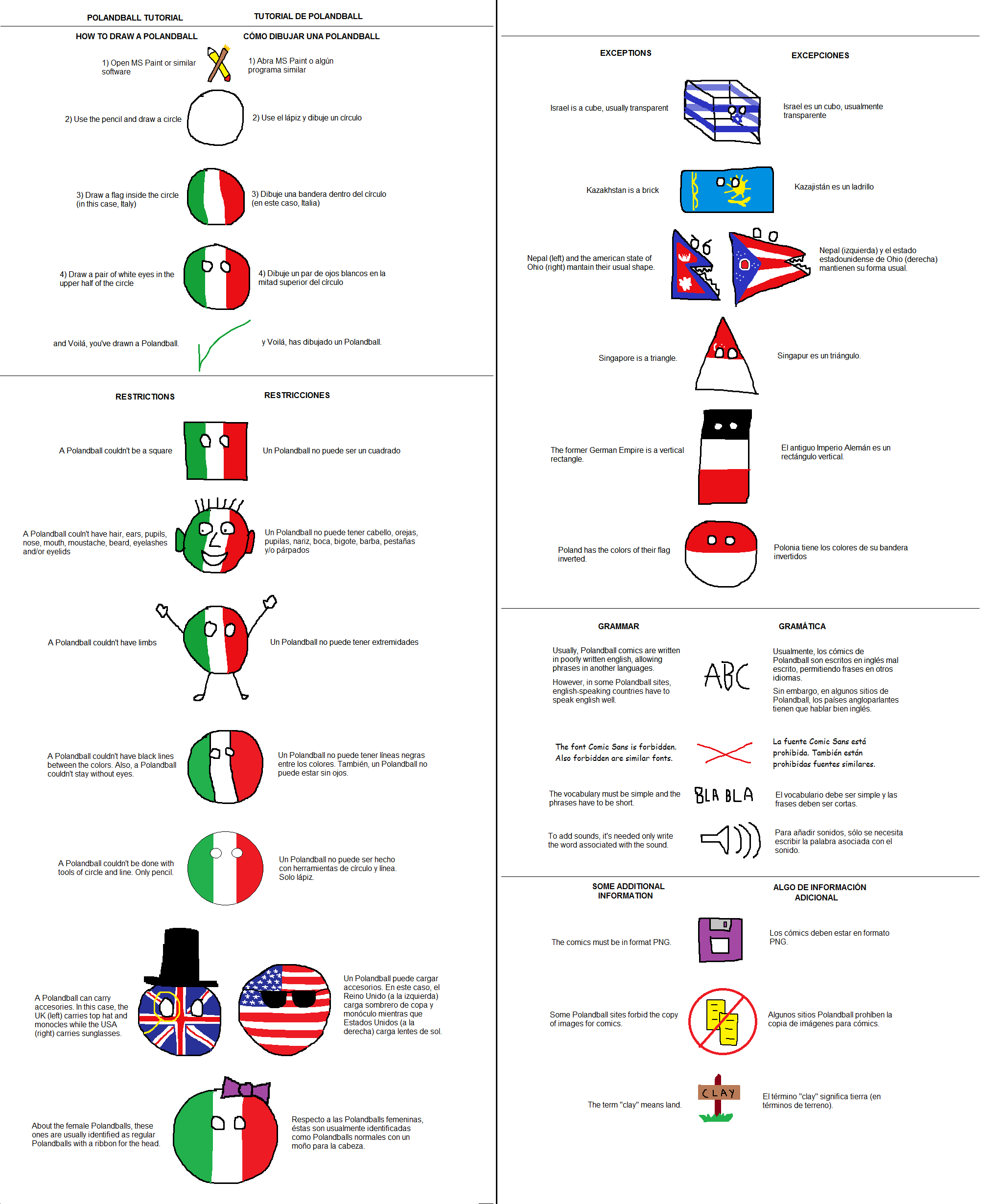
A basic Polandball tutorial

In May 2011, a subreddit named r/polandball was created that reached over 350,000 subscribers as of September 2017. In response to the POLANDBALL Facebook page's sharing of "non-orthodox" Polandball content, moderation of Polandball content on Reddit is much stricter and the "rules" of Polandball comics are more heavily enforced than on Facebook or other sites.

Before Redditors are allowed to submit comics to the subreddit, they must submit their first comic for approval by the moderators before being granted permission to post, and every comic must adhere to many pages of rules to preserve the high quality of content posted to the subreddit. Consequently, the subreddit's moderators are considered "strict and authoritarian by numerous people outside the website". Despite this reputation, r/polandball is generally considered to be the main hub of user-generated Polandball comics on the internet. According to the subreddit's side bar:

Polandball is unique and should remain so. It clearly stands apart from rage comics and memes. Read the official Polandball guidelines. To maintain high content quality, all comics must adhere to them.

Various Polandball tutorials have since been developed on Reddit and elsewhere on the internet to maintain the meme's distinct visual style.

=== YouTube ===
Between 2012 and 2017, YouTube channels featuring "Countryballs" content emerged, with the Belarusian channel Art's Animations reaching over 297,000 subscribers as of 2020. Another channel under the name No Idea Animations had achieved over 489,000 subscribers as of 2021. Unlike on Reddit (where moderation enforces normative standards for Polandball comics), "Countryballs" content on YouTube is more varied and often deviates from the conventions established on krautchan.

Countryballs content on YouTube overlaps with another genre of geopolitical content known as "mapping", with the primary purpose of tracking the historical and geographical changes occurring throughout historical periods of interest—due to its simplicity and versatility, the Countryballs format has proved popular with YouTubers producing "mapping" content.

== Characteristics and themes ==
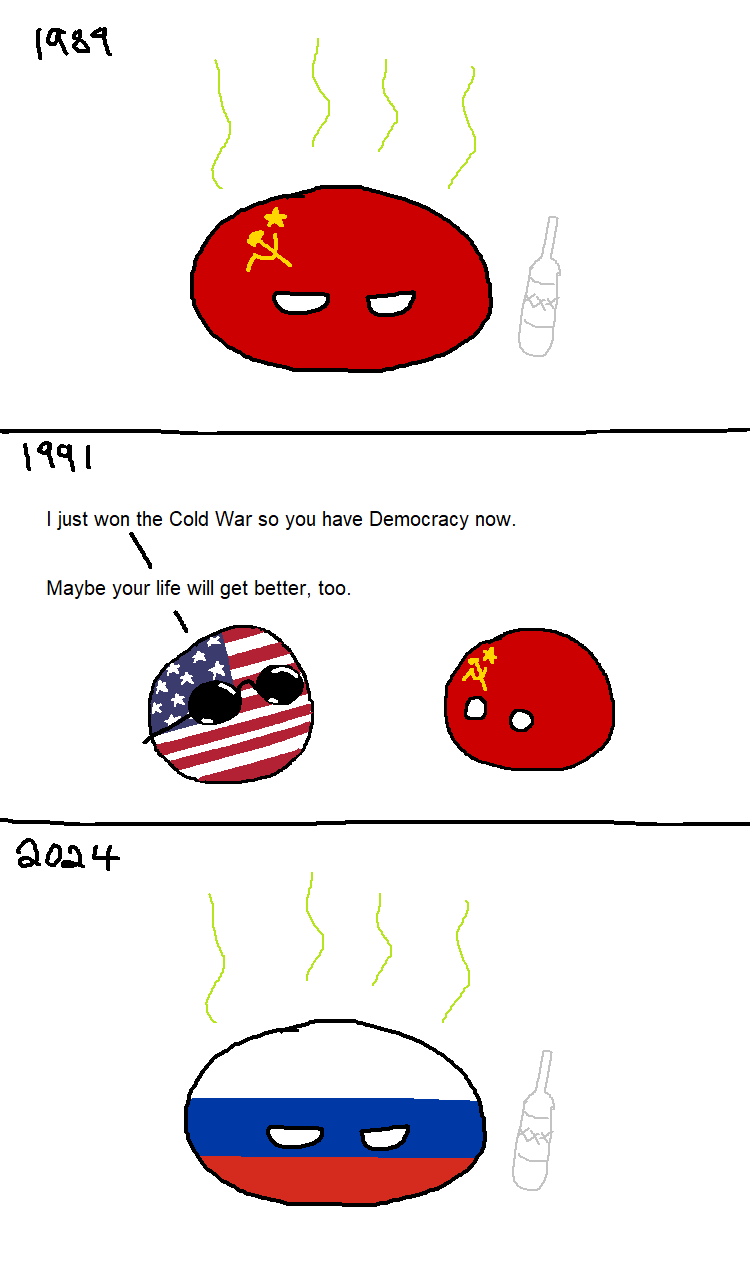
A Polandball comic satirizing the collapse of the Soviet Union and the end of the Cold War.

=== Satire ===
Similarly to the medium of political cartoons, Polandball comics aim to satirize a wide variety of topics, including political entities, geopolitical events, history, national stereotypes, international relations, and culture. Comics done in the Polandball style often employ stereotypes rooted in racism and xenophobia in their portrayal of countries. The intent is to create a caricature, such as Poland's common appearance in the comics as a poorly-educated, low-income immigrant speaking broken English.

Other satirical elements of Polandball comics include abridged or over-simplified accounts of historical events. In a paper titled Memes and Graphic Novels as Public History, Anna Borkiewicz notes that while "Some historical knowledge and knowledge of this and other countries' stereotypes is required to understand Polandball memes... the brevity of the format does not lend itself to providing detailed historical accounts, and often we see historical accuracy sacrificed in favor of unnuanced simplifications—from which a measure of humor may be derived."

While some Polandball comics feature a clearly offensive or racist agenda, moderators of r/Polandball believe that the high effort involved in producing Polandball comics (i.e. their hand-drawn nature), reduces the likelihood of traditional politicking through the Polandball format.

=== Artwork ===
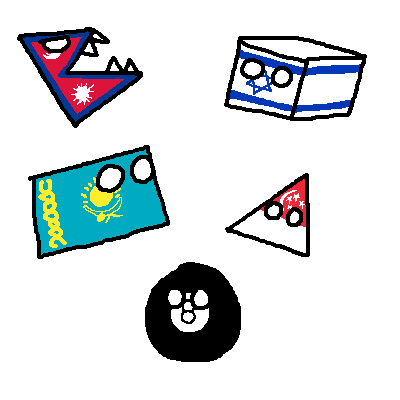
Examples of characters in Polandball comics that do not adhere to the standard "Countryball" conventions

Unlike rage comics or other template memes, the Polandball style is generally user-drawn. Conventions enforced by r/polandball include the avoidance of Microsoft Paint's line and rectangle tools, and the avoidance of the circle tool when drawing countryballs.

Some countries featured in Polandball comics have established conventions regarding the inclusion of props and/or accessories carried by their respective countryballs, such as sunglasses for the United States, and a top hat and monocle for the United Kingdom.

Although countryballs are the predominant form employed to portray countries in Polandball comics, the genre has spawned a variety of deviations from this convention:

- Nepal is depicted as a monster due to the atypical shape of its national flag.
- Kazakhstan is depicted as a brick. (This is a reference to an oversight by krautchan moderators when assigning countryball flairs to countries' flags on the board.)
- Israel and the Jewish Autonomous Oblast are depicted as hypercubes in reference to an early Polandball comic about "Jewish physics", satirizing a label used by Nazi Germany.
- Singapore and Bermuda are depicted as triangles. (Singapore's depiction is believed to be a reference to the Indonesia–Malaysia–Singapore growth triangle, while Bermuda's depiction is a reference to the Bermuda Triangle.)
- Various peoples that do not have flags or statehood, as well as other entities, are often represented by billiard balls. For example, Black people are depicted with the black 8-ball.

=== Dialogue ===
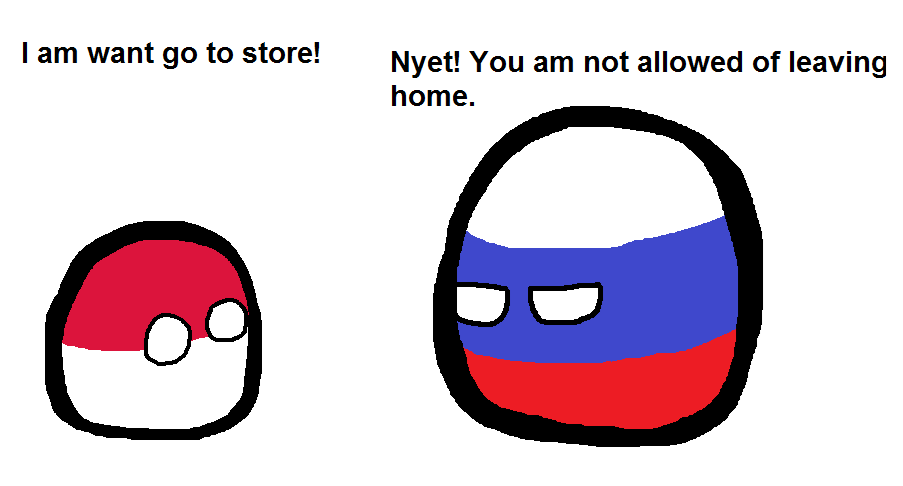
An example of broken English commonly employed in Polandball comics

Polandball comics extensively feature broken English dialogue for non-Anglosphere countries, or countries where English is not an official language. In a study on ludic normativity in Facebook meme pages, Ondrej Prochazka finds that, "The use of 'poorly written' or 'broken' English is strategic here. It involves styling – conscious deployment of various linguistic repertoires and their mixture depending on the individual countryball and author's access to Countryball universe."

Some common broken English tropes in Polandball comics include grammatically incorrect phrases like "can/cannot into" (as in the most famous Polandball phrase, "Poland cannot into space"), and incorrectly adding the plural progressive present tense suffix "-ings" to the end of verbs or other parts of speech. Broken English dialogue is also produced by including words phrases from languages other than English, or by employing another language's grammar structure or alphabet.

== See also ==
- Social commentary
- Editorial cartoon
- List of Internet memes
- Hetalia: Axis Powers – a Japanese webcomic in which the countries are personified as humans
- Year Hare Affair – a Chinese webcomic in which countries are personified as animals

== Bibliography ==
- Oleksiak, Wojciech (2014). "Polandball – A Case Study" (Culture.pl ed.). Archived from the original on 7 July 2016.
- "A lengyellabda, a Nepál-szörny, a zsidó hiperkocka és a többiek. Bevezetés a polandball világába" (in Hungarian). Corvinus Economist. 27 August 2014.
- Hoffman, Steven (2015). "How Polandball can of taking over internets" (газета) (Krakow Post ed.). Archived from the original on 1 April 2016. "2"
- Žnidaršič, Marjetka (2015). "Uporaba memov kot orodja komuniciranja na spletu" (PDF) (in Slovenian). Экономический факультет Люблянского университета. Archived (PDF) from the original on 20 January 2022.
- Söderlund, Bo; Olsson, Jesper (2016). Sverigedemokraterna och flyktingkrisen: En kritisk diskursanalys av Sverigedemokraternas aktivitet på sociala medier (PDF) (in Swedish).
- Schneider, Monique Thiene (2016). "Not in the privileged club" (PDF). Университет Неймегена.
- Гибадуллина, Н. М (2018). А. А. Зарайский (ed.). "Комиксы «Countrybollz»: визуализация политики в Интернете" (PDF). Форум Молодых Учёных. 3 (19). Naberezhnye Chelny: 120–125. ISSN 2500-4050. Archived (PDF) from the original on 10 May 2022.
- Seppänen, Otso (2018). "Puolapallot pölkkypäille" (PDF) (in Finnish) (Skrolli ed.). p. 38. Archived (PDF) from the original on 2 January 2021.
- Procházka, Ondřej (2018). ""Learn English before you start posting...": The sociolinguistics of inequality in a translocal Czech Facebook meme page". Learn English Before You Start Posting... Tilburg Papers in Culture Studies (210) (Tilburg Papers in Culture Studies ed.). Тилбургский университет: 1–21. Archived from the original on 30 May 2023.
- Procházka, Ondřej (2019). "Making Sense of Facebook's Content Moderation: A Posthumanist Perspective on Communicative Competence and Internet Memes". Signs and Society. 7 (3) (The University of Chicago Press ed.). Ostrava University: 362–397. doi:10.1086/704763.
- Федорченко, С. Н. (2019). "Интернет-мемы как элемент медиатизации политической повестки на примере международных отношений". Журнал Политических Исследований. 3 (2): 42–58. ISSN 2587-6295.
- И. А. Снежкова; Н. В. Шалыгина, eds. (2020). "Глава 4. Креативные формы молодежного восприятия образа страны. Россия, Беларусь и новые формы визуальности: Countryballs и Humanization (Д. В. Громов)". Образы России и Беларуси в представлениях молодежи двух стран в XXI веке (PDF). М.: Институт этнологии и антропологии имени Н. Н. Миклухо-Маклая РАН, Белорусский государственный университет. p. 365.
- Procházka, Ondřej (2020). Negotiating ludic normativity in Facebook meme pages. Vol. 8 (Tilburg Papers in Culture Studies ed.). Tilburg University. pp. 1–159. ISBN 978-94-6416-307-0.
- Torffvit, Simon (2021). En formell titt på informell svensk historia. En analys av populära internationella forums brukande av svensk historia genom internet memes (in Swedish). pp. 31–35.
- Borkiewicz, Anna (2021). "12 Polandball. Memes and Graphic Novels as Public History". Public History in Poland. Routledge. ISBN 978-1-000-50588-7.
- Ertanowska, Delfina (August 2021). Countryballs: political comics as a form of alternative media narrative (PDF) (Професійне становлення журналіста: традиції та нові підходи : збірник матеріалів Четвертої міжнародної науково-практичної конференції студентів та молодих учених ed.). Львов: Львовский национальный университет имени Ивана Франко. pp. 130–133. ISBN 978-617-100-578-5. Archived (PDF) from the original on 22 April 2022.
- Valtonen, Aino (2022). "Nobody would say hi to someone they don't know" : Depictions of Finnishness by American TikTok creators (Thesis). Университет Йювяскюля. Archived from the original on 16 November 2024.
