= NPC (meme) =

Insult implying a lack of critical thinking

NPC (non-player character)
- The NPC
- First appearance: July 7, 2016; 10 years ago
- Created by: Anonymous /v/ user
- Based on: Wojak

The NPC (/ˈɛn piː siː/ EN-pee-SEE; also known as the NPC Wojak), derived from non-player character (NPC), is a Wojak character that represents people deemed to not think for themselves. It refers to those who lack introspection or intrapersonal communication, or whose identity is deemed entirely determined by their surroundings and the information they consume, with no conscious processing or discernment being done by the person themselves. The meme gained viral status on TikTok in 2022, with the surge of "NPC Streamers". The NPC Wojak, which is graphically based on the Wojak memes, was created in July 2016 by an anonymous author and first published on the imageboard 4chan, where the idea and inspiration behind the meme were introduced.

In terms of politics, it has often been used by those with anti-establishment views to describe those who fail to question authority, "groupthink", or a stance that would display conformity and obedience. The NPC character became a meme and gained mainstream popularity during the first presidency of Donald Trump. In October 2018, the meme was covered by numerous news outlets, including The Verge, the BBC, and The New York Times, who called it a popular insult among "the pro-Trump internet" as well as a "collective mascot for the far-right commenters". The following month, InfoWars held a competition promoting the creation of NPC memes; the winning entry was endorsed by Trump on Twitter.

== History ==
Computer games and video games often have characters controlled by the computer who have simple repetitive behaviour, such as attacking anyone they see who is not on their team or offering to pay gold to anyone who kills ten giant rats. Insulting definitions of NPC can be seen on Urban Dictionary in 2008, and on other forums around the same time period. By 2010, members of the LessWrong subculture in California called people outside their subculture NPCs because they supposedly followed rules without thinking.

In 2016, the concept was revived in a 4chan post by an anonymous user who created a graphic and turned NPC from a slur into a meme. The post asked "Are you an NPC?" and detailed the behaviour of individuals acting similarly to non-player characters in video games by repeatedly using phrases such as "JUST BE YOURSELF", and ended the post with the following description of people the NPC meme intends to depict.

If you get in a discussion with them it's always the same buzzwords and hackneyed arguments. They're the kind of people who make a show of discomfort when you break the status quo like by breaking the normie barrier to invoke a real discussion. it's like in a [video game] when you accidentally talk to somebody twice and they give you the exact lines word for word once more.

— Anonymous, "Are you an NPC?", 4chan (July 7, 2016) (Note: The text was accompanied by a drawing from a Frog and Toad story concerning a to-do list, with below it "1. ~~Wake Up~~".)

The concept gained renewed attention in September 2018, when a user of 4chan's /pol/ board shared a Psychology Today article suggesting that not all people experience inner speech, presenting it as evidence that "NPCs" exist. The acronym was soon given its own image, a grey version of Wojak, and a wave of NPC memes followed.

The design of the NPC meme character is based on Wojak, a meme created in Microsoft Paint in 2010. Unlike the NPC meme, the Wojak meme (also known as Feels Guy) appeared first on the image hosting website vichan and has mainly been used for expression of feelings, most often melancholy or regret.

The NPC meme became popular in far-right Internet spaces, being used to describe those who do not share conservative political views—particularly liberals. Writing for The New York Times, Kevin Roose called it a "collective mascot for the far-right commenters online." During the weeks leading up to the 2018 midterm elections in the United States, the NPC meme gained remarkable attention, with relatively high media coverage, publication of new NPC memes online, and several noticeable events. A large number of animated videos based on the NPC meme were uploaded to YouTube in the second half of October 2018, and Google searches for the term "NPC Wojak" peaked around the same time. In October 2018, a large number of Twitter accounts presenting themselves as NPCs were created and subsequently suspended.. In November, the far-right InfoWars held a competition promoting the creation of NPC memes. The winning entry, by a Twitter user named "Carpe Donktum", was later retweeted by then-U.S. President Donald Trump in February 2019 before it was removed for copyright infringement. The re-election campaign for then-Iowa Representative Steve King also tweeted an NPC meme around the same time, aimed at the sitting Democratic members of Congress.

The number of searches for the search term "NPC Wojak" remained relatively constant during 2019, though at a level significantly lower than its peak from early October through mid November 2018.

Although the NPC meme was created six years after the Wojak meme, the NPC meme rapidly gained attention in comparison with the Wojak meme. On the website of the meme community Know Your Meme, the NPC meme had 858,000 page views, 33 videos, 597 images and 749 comments as of December 31, 2019. This can be compared to the Wojak meme on which NPC is based, which had 787,000 page views, 6 videos, 332 images and 47 comments as of December 31, 2019.

In 2022, a variation of the NPC meme called "I Support The Current Thing" became popular. According to Slate, the meme was mainly used by the political right to mock liberals for "perceived conformism, frivolousness, and distractibility" who "blindly flit from news story to news story, issue to issue, changing their Facebook profile pics and Twitter display names to 'support' whatever 'Current Thing' dominates news and commentary. The current thing has been the Russian invasion of Ukraine, essential workers, the Women's March, Notre Dame after it caught on fire, etc." In March 2022, Elon Musk tweeted a version of the meme.

== Characteristics ==
In appearance, the NPC character is grey in colour, and usually short in stature simple in its design, with an expressionless face, a triangular nose and a blank stare. The shape of the NPC face resembles that of Wojak, and is drawn crudely.

The initial NPC refers to non-player character, a term used in video-games for characters the player cannot control. A non-player character typically interacts with the player through simple and repetitive actions, such as saying the same sentence each time the player approaches the NPC. For example: "Greetings!" or "What's the gossip guys?". As such, NPCs have "no internality, agency, or capacity for critical thought", they rely on scripted lines and do not think for themselves. Following the analogy of non-player characters, the NPC meme is used to mock individuals the maker perceives as lacking introspection, individual opinions, or critical thinking, generally political opponents. Due to NPC memes' greater popularity among the political right, the NPC is generally portrayed as parroting left-wing positions, but both left- and right-wing NPC variants exist.

=== Academic analysis ===
In a 2023 peer-reviewed study published in Big Data & Society, media scholars Rob Gallagher and Robert Topinka analysed 112,530 posts and comments mentioning "NPC" on the /pol/ boards of 4chan and 8chan and on several right-leaning subreddits, including r/The_Donald, between June 2018 and June 2019. They found that mentions on 4chan's /pol/ peaked at 3,177 on the day before The New York Times published its article on the meme, while mentions on r/The_Donald peaked on 11 October 2018, before the Twitter suspensions. Mentions fell sharply on both platforms after the Times coverage. The authors concluded that mainstream attention briefly amplified the meme but reduced its value within the subcultures where it had originated.

The study also identified differences between platforms. On /pol/, early NPC posts were largely philosophical before shifting toward race and ethnicity, while usage on r/The_Donald was mainly partisan and aimed at liberals and the left. The meme was also used between right-wing communities, with /pol/ users at times describing r/The_Donald users as NPCs. While describing the meme as a vehicle for racist, sexist and antidemocratic ideas, the authors argued that some NPC memes contain an implicit critique of how social media platforms encourage impulsive and predictable behaviour, drawing on Jodi Dean's concept of "communicative capitalism".

== Media coverage ==
The NPC meme has been featured in major and minor news outlets alike, with frequent coverage during the peak of the NPC's popularity in fall 2018. According to The Verge, a few articles (including one by The New York Times published on October 16, 2018) sparked a "domino effect" and led to increased spread of the meme on Twitter, YouTube and through articles.

== Notable events ==
=== Twitter mass ban ===
In October 2018, users of r/The_Donald, a large subreddit that supported United States President Donald Trump, coordinated in creating accounts presented as NPCs on the microblogging and social networking service Twitter. According to The Week, the accounts spread "bland, politically correct messages intended to mimic and provoke liberal pronouncements". Following the mass creation of NPC Twitter accounts, the term "NPC" was used over 30,000 times on Twitter in a time span of 24 hours. Twitter responded to the event by banning more than 1,500 of its users presenting themselves as NPCs. The created accounts typically used profile pictures of NPC with slight modifications, such as colorful hair or partially covering masks. According to one or more anonymous sources quoted by The Week and The New York Times, the users were banned for violating a term of use by Twitter against "intentionally misleading election-related content", ahead of the United States 2018 midterm election. The claim that NPC memes were used to spread misinformation about the 2018 United States midterm election was also reported by other news agencies, including The Verge, the BBC and The Independent. According to the BBC, the decision by Twitter to remove NPC accounts has upset many conservatives.

According to Gallagher and Topinka, the suspensions followed some NPC accounts posting inaccurate information about the date of the election. Their analysis of r/The_Donald posts from 11 to 13 October 2018 found the account creation to be more spontaneous than an organized campaign, with users reporting on reactions to the accounts and encouraging one another to create more.

=== Billboard defacing ===
In 2019, the NPC meme was used in the modification of two existing billboards in the United States.

On January 13, 2019, the conservative street artist group The Faction modified a billboard featuring American comedian Bill Maher in West Hollywood using the NPC meme.

On February 19, 2019, a similar modification was performed on a billboard featuring the comedian John Oliver in Los Angeles, in which the face of Oliver was replaced by that of an NPC, and text "Last Week Tonight with John Oliver" was replaced by "The Orange Man Bad Show with John Oliver". The modified billboard also included the text "*MATRIX APPROVED NPC PROGRAMMING" and a speech balloon from the NPC containing words such as "CHEETOH" [sic] and "DRUMPH" with random symbols in green text, resembling the text shown in The Matrix. According to The Daily Dot, the modification of the billboard featuring Oliver, also credited to The Faction, was an attempt to counteract the media's supposed "Trump derangement syndrome".

=== 2023 stabbing ===
On March 22, 2023, in Mill Creek, Washington, a 29-year-old man stabbed an 11-year-old boy near a Dollar Tree after the boy insulted him by calling him an NPC.

=== NPC streaming ===
Beginning in 2022, and more widely in 2023, a livestreaming trend known as "NPC streaming" became popular on TikTok. In it, creators imitated video game non-player characters by responding to virtual gifts sent by viewers with fixed, repetitive phrases and movements. Among the earliest creators to adopt the format were the TikTokers Natuecoco and Satoyu727, who had previously performed as anime-style characters.

The trend received widespread attention in 2023 through the Montreal-based creator Pinkydoll, whose catchphrase "ice cream so good", said whenever a viewer sent a virtual ice cream cone, went viral. Leading NPC streamers were reported to earn thousands of dollars per day from virtual gifts, with TikTok retaining a share of the proceeds. Some viewers and commentators said the content had sexual undertones.

== See also ==
- List of Internet phenomena
- Philosophical zombie – a philosophical thought experiment that imagines a being which appears to display consciousness but is actually not conscious.
- Straw man
- Dehumanization
- Soyjak
