= Baozou =

Chinese website

- Website type: Web comics and videos
- Editor: Wang Nima (Chinese: 王尼玛)
- Website: baozou.com

Baozou (Chinese: 暴走) is a website featuring comics and animations. The Baozou style of comics, originally inspired by rage comics of the US, was popularized in China and later developed into its own style.

Bauzou is an Internet phenomenon, emerging from the specific sociopolitical context of contemporary China, and a staple in Chinese popular online culture, arguably triggering the meme subculture in China.

Still or animated Baozou figures are created and used as emoticons to depict simple and crude visuals used in electronic or web messages. Internet users often use Baozou figures in parody of a range of different emotions. Baozou (which roughly translates to "out of control" or rage in Chinese) also produces Baozou Big News Events, a popular humorous show covering news, literature, history, psychology, politics, chemistry and biology.

== Background ==
In 2008, Wang Nima founded the baozoumanhua.com website to spread the popularity of images he created from rage comics. The new form of comic became known as Baozou comics. The rough, unpolished comics are typically created by amateurs and spread across the internet. Baozou is known as a parody franchise, but the website has expanded to include live action stand-up, Flash animation shorts, apps, anime parodies, and an animated series of short stories. One of the website's developments is the app, Baozou Daily. The website's videos also appear on YouTube.

Wang Nima, founder and editor in chief of Baozou, was named one of the top 10 web celebrities of the decade in China by search engine Baidu, in part for his work on Baozou Big News Events, an internet show by Baozou that covers news and other popular subjects.

Baozou founded the Baozou Foundation that aims to help young people in need.

== Emoticons ==
Emoticons made in the Baozou style are often parodies of emotions. 400 Baozou faces have been pulled from baozoumanhua.com, and over 300 Baozou faces can be found on WeChat. The faces are universal, using exaggerated facial expressions for comedic effect. They often mock common experiences rather than targeting insults. Baozou emoticons also tend to be general-neutral. Premade faces that can be found on the baozoumanhua.com website include celebrity faces such as Yao Ming and Jackie Chan. Users take the pre-made faces or other images and alter them using Microsoft Paint or Adobe Photoshop to depict a desired emotion. Baozou established the UGC platform which allows users to create and share content.

== Baozou Big News Events ==
Baozou Big News Events, also referred to as Baozou Big News, is a Chinese internet talk-variety show which is produced by Baozoumanhua. The show has created Internet buzzwords that are widely used in China. The host, Wang Nima, wears a headpiece with a comic face on it and reports ridiculous news events. The show imitate the BBC comedy news show Russell Howard's Good News. The first season aired from March 29 to August 8, 2013, the second season from December 20, 2013, to June 20, 2014, the third season from June 27, 2014, to June 26, 2015, and the fourth season was released on July 10, 2015. The initial season aired ever two weeks with short episodes. As the show evolved, the style and schedule changed to being released once a week.

== In popular culture ==
In China, Baozou has gained public attention. The comics appear in online communications including instant messaging platforms such as WeChat and QQ as well as micro blogs, e-bulletin boards and forums. The popularity of the comics is in part due to the growing sensation of emoticons in China. Baozou comic creators have created facial expressions from online photos and videos that are used across the web to express feelings.

The science fiction film Next Gen is based on the Baozou comic 7723.
