= Nyah nyah nyah nyah nyah nyah =

Common children's chant

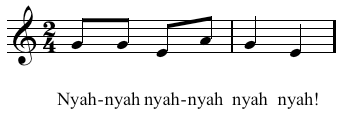
The nyah-nyah tune features a descending minor third.

"Nyah nyah nyah nyah nyah nyah" is the lexigraphic representation of a common children's chant. It is a rendering of one common vocalization for a six-note musical figure (Note: Sometimes five-note, with the first two notes combined as one long note ("Nyaaahh nyah nyah nyah nyah") or other variations, such as the third note shortened or the fifth note stressed in volume, intonation, or duration, and so forth.) that is usually associated with children and found in many European-derived cultures, and which is often used in taunting.

== Variations ==
The tune has many variations on how "nyah-nyah" is vocalized (e.g., "Nuh nuh nuh nuh nuh nuh"), some examples of which include:

- "Nanny nanny boo boo", "Na-na na-na boo-boo", or "Neener neener neener" in the United States
- "Fang mich doch du Eierloch" in Germany (meaning "come catch me, you egghole")
- "Du kan ikke fange mig" in Denmark (meaning "you can't catch me") or "æv bæv bussemand, sure tæer i saftevand"
- "Na na na na nère" (also "nanananère") in France
- "Naa na na naa na" in the Netherlands
- "Naaa na na na naaa", "Na na na na na naaa" or "A que no me pillas" in Spain
- "Ni ni ni ni" in Arab countries, Morocco, Algeria
- "Naa na banana" in Israel (meaning "mint (and) banana")
- "Läl-läl-läl-läl lie-ru" (a taunt) or "et saa mua kiinni" in Finland (meaning "you can't catch me")
- "Skvallerbytta bing bång" (meaning "tattletale ding dong") or "du kan inte ta mig" (meaning "you can't catch me") in Sweden
- "Ædda bædda buse" in Norway
- "Lero lero" in Mexico
- "La la la la la la" in Turkish
- "Wêla kapela" in Southern Africa
- "Você não me pega" in Brazil (meaning "(you) can't catch me" in Portuguese)
- "Non mi hai fatto niente, faccia di serpente" in Italy (meaning "you didn't hurt me, you snake face" in Italian)
- "Na nana nana na" or "Lala lala la la" in Australia and New Zealand, commonly preceded by playground taunts

The tune is also heard in Canada, Australia, Spain, Portugal, Germany, Serbia, Slovenia, Bosnia and Herzegovina, the United Kingdom, and Iceland.

Children in Korea use a different figure (on the same pentatonic scale) for teasing: la-so-la-so mi-re-mi-re, with the vocalization 얼레리 꼴레리 (eol-re-ri kkol-re-ri). A Japanese variant is so-so-mi-mi so-mi-mi, and in Mexico a so-la-so-mi, so-la-so-mi figure is found.

The initial taunt is sometimes followed by further verses using the same tune: for instance, "nanny nanny nanny goat, cannot catch a billy goat" or following "nanny nanny boo boo" with "stick your head in doo-doo". French children might follow "na na na na nère" with "pouette pouette camembert". In Croatia, children sing, "Ulovi me, ulovi me, kupit ću ti novine. Novine su skupe, poljubi me u dupe" (which means: "Catch me, catch me, I'll buy you a newspaper. Newspapers are pricey, kiss my tushie"). The Spanish children's song "A La Rueda Rueda" comes from this melody.

While the word "nyah" is now defined as being in and of itself an expression of contemptuous superiority over another, this is by derivation from the "nyah-nyah..." chant rather than vice versa so the "nyah-nyah..." vocalization version of the chant is, at least in origin, an example of communication entirely by paralanguage. Context-meaningful words are sometimes applied ad hoc, however, such as "Johnny is a sis-sy", "I got the blue one", or "I can see your underwear!" Shirley Jackson referred to it as the "da da, da-da da" or "I know a secret" chant in Life Among the Savages.

== Other uses ==
Non-taunting uses of the tune exist, which are also associated with children. Several playground songs use the "Nyah nyah..." musical figure, including A Tisket, A Tasket; It's Raining, It's Pouring; and some variants of Ring a Ring o' Roses, Bye, Baby Bunting and Olly olly oxen free. The tune has been used as an advertising jingle by the confectionery company Haribo.

The figure appears in the Benjamin Britten opera The Rape of Lucretia (1946) during a scene where the Roman and Etruscan generals mock each other.

Descendents centered the song "I Don't Want To Grow Up" around the figure in their 1985 album of the same name.

The tune (in both the "nah" and "nyah" forms) features as the chorus of the theme song 'It's Not Fair' from the 'Horrid Henry' animated TV series on CITV.

== See also ==
- Children's song
- Cocking a snook
- Blowing a raspberry
- Trollface

== Bibliography ==
- Liberman, Mark Yoffe (1978). The Intonational System of English (Dissertation). Indiana University Linguistics Club. OCLC 910372009.
