= Leeroy Jenkins =

World of Warcraft meme character

- World of Warcraft character
- Leeroy Jenkins as an NPC in World of Warcraft
- First appearance: Leeroy!! (video); 2005
- Created by: Ben Schulz

In-universe information
- Class: Paladin

Leeroy Jenkins is a player character created by Ben Schulz in Blizzard Entertainment's multiplayer online video game World of Warcraft. The character was popularized in a 2005 viral video of game footage. In the video, having been absent during a discussion of a meticulous battle plan, Leeroy returns and ruins it by charging into combat while shouting his name as a battle cry. The video became an Internet meme. In response to the meme, Blizzard added Leeroy Jenkins into World of Warcraft as an official non-player character, and later as a minion card and cosmetic item in the online card game Hearthstone. During Overwatch's World of Warcraft collaboration, Torbjörn Lindholm received a voiceline calling out his own name in a similar fashion to Leeroy.

== Origin ==
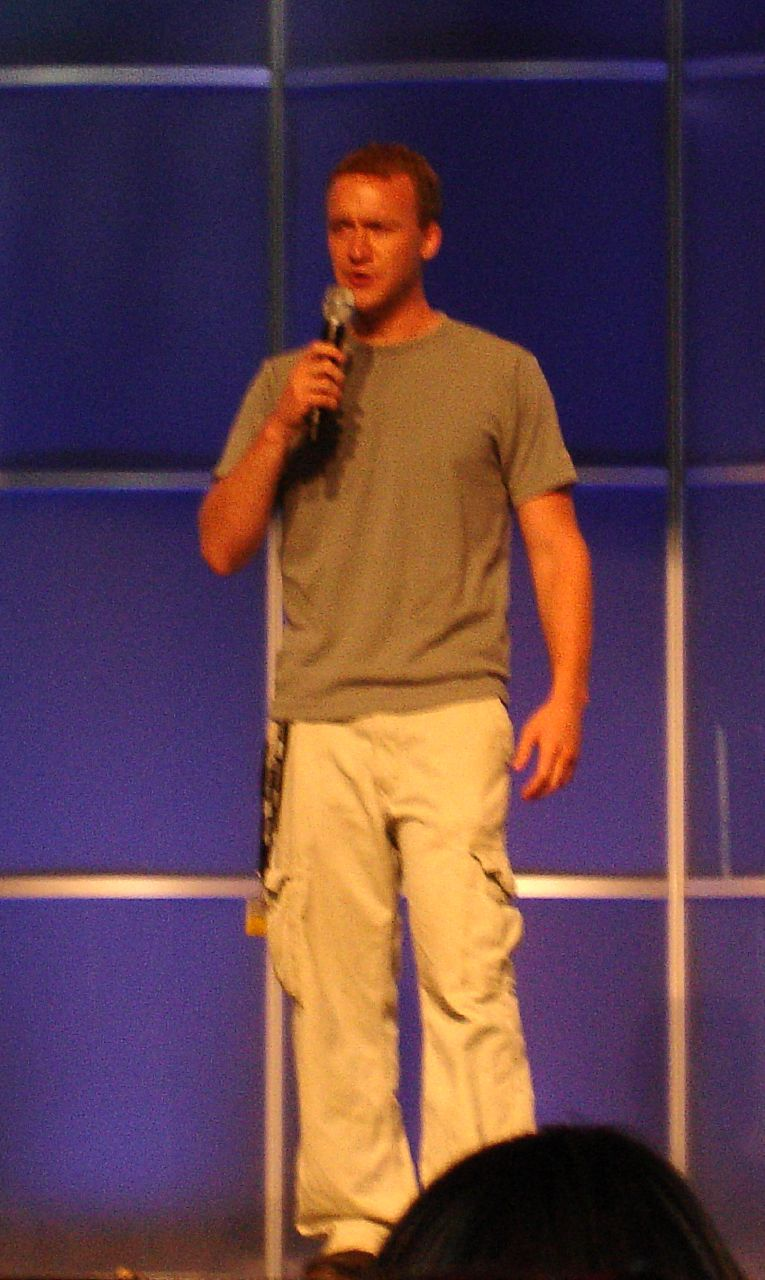
Ben Schulz at the 2007 BlizzCon

The original video, titled Leeroy!!, was released by the World of Warcraft player guild "Pals for Life" to video-sharing site Warcraftmovies on May 11, 2005. The video features a group of players discussing a detailed battle plan for their next encounter: The Rookery in Upper Blackrock Spire. As they lay out the plan, Leeroy is away from his computer, preparing a plate of chicken. This plan is intended to help Leeroy obtain a piece of armor from the boss, Solakar Flamewreath. This plan is ruined when Leeroy returns and, ignorant of the strategy, utters "Let's do this!" then immediately rushes headlong into battle shouting his own name in a stylized battle cry. As he runs in, one of the companions says "oh my God, he just ran in." After his companions sit silent for a moment in disbelief, they try to save him, but the chaotic nature of the fight leads into everyone being killed by the swarm of hatching dragon whelps. The guild chastises Leeroy for rushing into the fight without any planning, to which he retorts, "At least I have chicken!"

The Internet meme started with the release of the video clip called A Rough Go to the World of Warcraft game forum in a thread titled "UBRS (vid) Rookery Overpowered! blue plz.", which presented the video in a serious context. The thread requested that other players provide help with strategy and that Blizzard reduce the difficulty of the encounter. The video spread as an Internet meme, and Leeroy's response to the other players' chastisements, "At least I have chicken!", was also much mimicked.

In a March 2007 interview with Westword, Ben Schulz said the name "Leeroy Jenkins" originated from him and his friends drinking and creating "the most culturally inappropriate character names imaginable for a bunch of white guys playing video games." When asked in April 2008 about the creation of the video by National Public Radio, Schulz said the players "were drinking 40s and just yelling at each other." As time went on, some began suggesting that the video may have been staged, which Schulz refused to confirm or deny. In December 2017, Schulz, along with Ben "Anfrony" Vinson, who recorded the video, released what he described as a first take or dry run of the video. Vinson stated, "We didn't think anyone would believe it was real, we thought it was so obviously satire."

== Legacy ==
Leeroy Jenkins was included as a card within the World of Warcraft Trading Card Game released on October 25, 2006, with art by Mike Krahulik of Penny Arcade fame. A "Leeroy Jenkins" Legendary card was later released in Blizzard's online card game Hearthstone, as part of the game's base ("Classic") set, using the same art as that of the WoW Trading Card Game. Upper Deck Entertainment released a World of Warcraft Miniatures game in fall 2008, which included a Leeroy Jenkins figurine.

The May 2005 issue of PC Gamer UK featured an article on the video, titled "The Ballad of Leeroy Jenkins". The article took the position that the video was designed as a negative commentary on the kind of "nerd-guilds" whose members fastidiously plan raids with all the seriousness of actual military tacticians. They added that they felt Leeroy is the hero acting against the geekiness of his guild. In a 2009 article in the Armed Forces Journal titled "Let's Do This!: Leeroy Jenkins and the American Way of Advising," Capt. Robert M Chamberlain links Jenkins to the American approach to advising the indigenous armed forces in Iraq. IGN placed Jenkins 10th on their 2017 list of best Blizzard characters, noting that he represents the crossing of a line which typically separates a game's content and its community.

In 2008, Blizzard added an achievement to World of Warcraft called "Leeeeeeeeeeeeeroy!", which awards the title of "Jenkins" to players who kill 50 of the rookery whelps from the video within 15 seconds. Blizzard also added a "Leeroy Jenkins" card to their popular online card game Hearthstone. In March 2022, Leeroy Jenkins debuted as a playable mercenary character in Hearthstone's Mercenaries game mode.

Jenkins has also been referenced in popular culture outside World of Warcraft, including a question on Jeopardy!, mentions on television programs such as How I Met Your Mother and Barry, in a World of Warcraft–based Toyota Tacoma truck advertisement, deleted scenes from 2009 movies Year One and Monsters Vs. Aliens and appearances in video games not developed or published by Blizzard, such as Mass Effect. Part of the Family Guy episode "Veteran Guy" is based on Leeroy!! video. On March 12, 2012, Jon Stewart's The Daily Show used Leeroy Jenkins in a clip when talking about the Republican Convention. In 2019, political commentator Ben Shapiro compared US president Donald Trump to Leeroy Jenkins in episode 817 of The Ben Shapiro Show titled President Leeroy Jenkins. During the prolonged vote for the Speaker of the House of the 118th United States Congress in January 2023, Representative Jared Huffman evoked the meme when voting for candidate Hakeem Jeffries. In South Park's "Make Love, Not Warcraft" episode, there is a "neckbeard" named Jenkins who spends all of his time in World of Warcraft going around killing other players' characters.

In 2024, Blizzard held a crossover between Overwatch 2 and World of Warcraft. Among other cosmetics referencing characters from World of Warcraft, two voice lines were added to the character Torbjörn Lindholm, where he shouts his name in a similar manner to Leeroy Jenkins, and also says "at least I have chicken".
