= Baozou Big News Events =

Chinese talk show program

Baozou Big News Events (Chinese: 暴走大事件) is a Chinese Internet talk-variety show program produced by Baozou. It covers the topics of news, literature, history, psychology, geography, politics, chemistry, biology and more. The Host wears a headgear with a comic face during the show, and uses humorous words to report ridiculous news events. The show became popular among Chinese Internet users, and has a young audience. It imitates the program style and title sequence of Russell Howard's Good News, a BBC comedy and topical news show.

Baozou Big News Events reviews the news satirically, allowing the audience to reflect upon the said news events after having a laugh. It was also the first to organize the Red Nose Day in China, which has helped a lot of poor Chinese children.

This show has created many Internet buzzwords, which are widely used by Chinese Internet users. It has also derived a series of Internet shows, such as Baozou Kan Sha Pian (暴走看啥儿片)， Baozou Lu A Lu (暴走撸啊撸) and so on.

== History ==
The show has had 4 seasons so far. The first season started from March 29 to August 8, 2013, the second from December 20, 2013 to June 20, 2014, the third from June 27, 2014 to June 26, 2015, and the fourth released on July 10, 2015.

During the first season, the show was short and only updated bi-weekly, lacking experience for watchers. Accepting viewer's criticisms, the director changed the show's style. The reporter, Wang Nima, began to report news standing instead of sitting and the production team also moved to a new shooting field. For the third season, the show's update cycle was abridged into weekly.

It was banned on 17 May 2018, along with other Baozou Comic products. The official reason was the programme has broken the Martyr Protection Law of China. The Chinese government reported that Baozou Big News's account released a 58 seconds video on Toutiao which was recognized to have made fun of Chinese martyrs. The video was a short period cut from the fourth season of the programme which was aimed at criticizing some awful advertisement. But from the little period, it looks like that the programme has teased the Chinese martyr — "Dong Cunrui said: 'I am an eight points of youth, and this is my eight points of hamburger.'" After that, Wang Nima made a sincere apologize to the public.
