= Rage comic =

Internet meme

An example of a rage comic

A rage comic is a short cartoon strip using a growing set of pre-made cartoon faces, or rage faces, which usually express rage or some other simple emotion or activity. They are usually crudely drawn in Microsoft Paint or other simple drawing programs, and were most popular in the early 2010s. These webcomics have spread much in the same way that Internet memes do, and several memes have originated in this medium. They have been characterized by Ars Technica as an "accepted and standardized form of online communication". The popularity of rage comics has been attributed to their use as vehicles for humorizing shared experiences.

== History ==
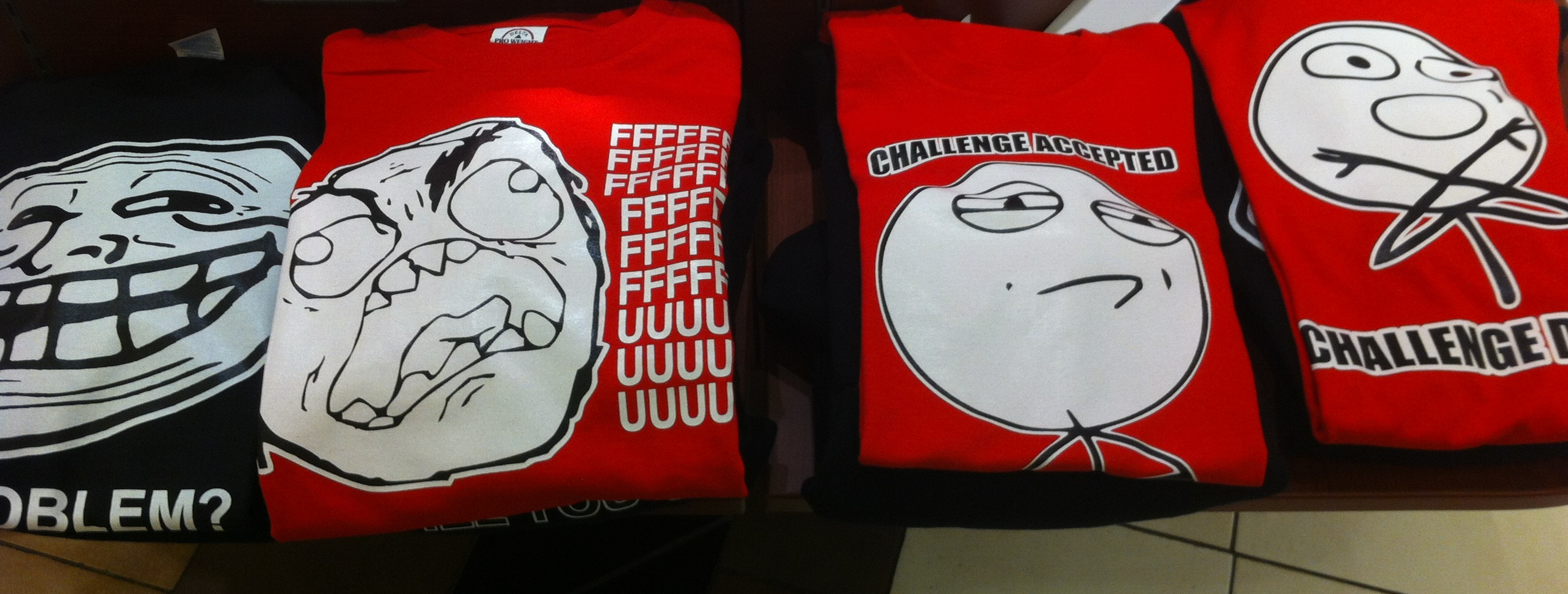
T-shirts featuring internet meme rage comics, seen in 2013, at their height.

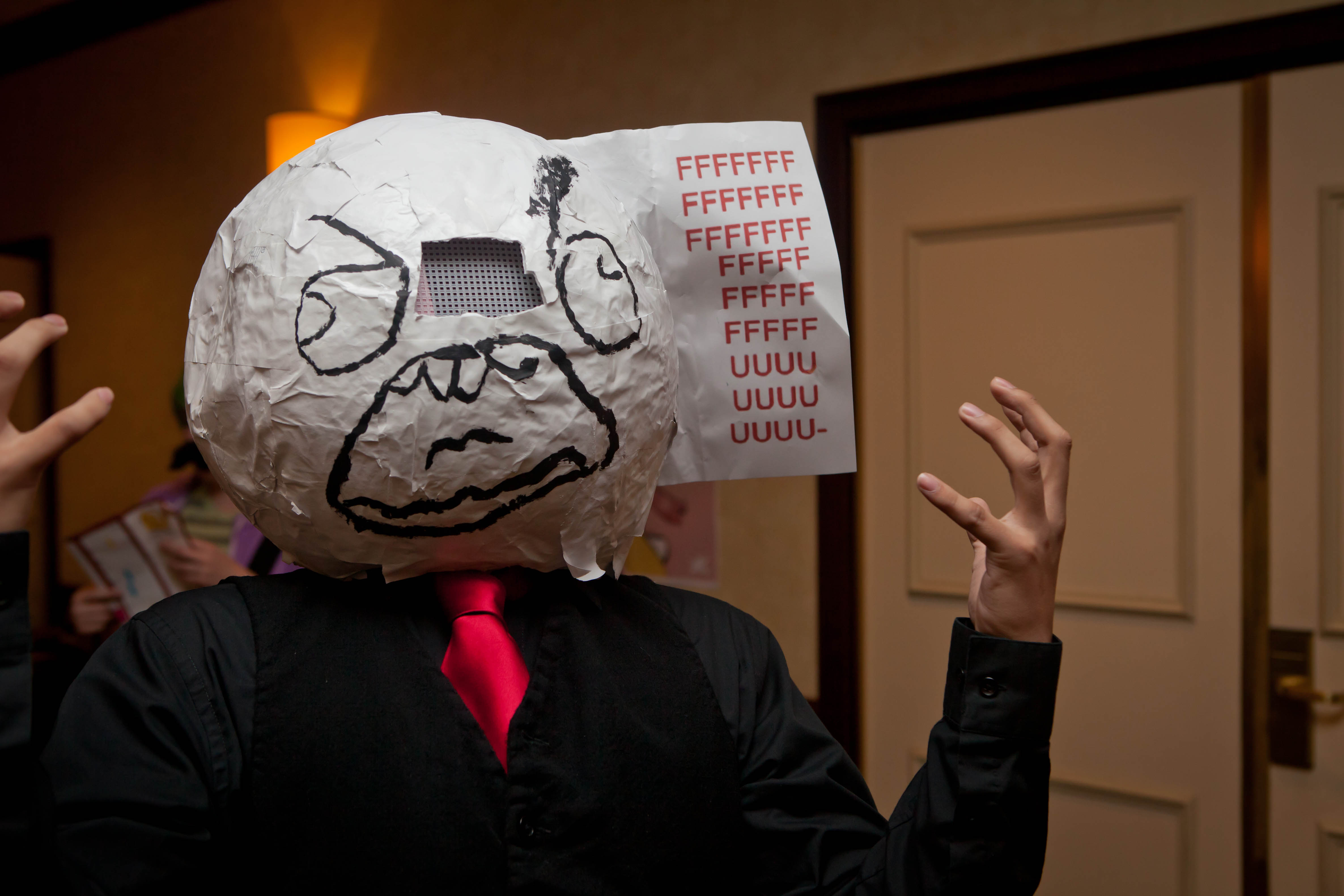
A man cosplaying as Rage Guy at Anime Los Angeles 2012

Although used on numerous websites such as Reddit, Cheezburger, ESS.MX, Ragestache, and 9GAG, the source of the rage comic has largely been attributed to 4chan in mid-2008. The first rage comic was posted to the 4chan /b/ "Random" board in 2008. It was a simple 4-panel strip showing the author's anger about having water splash into their anus while on the toilet, with the final panel featuring a zoomed-in face, known as Rage Guy, saying "FFFFFFFFFFFFFFFFFFFFFFFUUUUUUUUUUUUUUUUUUUUUU-". It was quickly reposted and modified, with other users creating new scenarios and characters.

Google Trends data shows that the term "rage guy" peaked in February 2012 while the terms "rage comics" and "troll face" both peaked at the same time. The range of expression and standardized, easily identifiable faces has allowed uses such as teaching English as a foreign language.

One of the most widely used rage comic faces is the Trollface, drawn by Oakland artist Carlos Ramirez in 2008. Originally posted in a comic to his DeviantArt account Whynne about Internet trolling on 4chan, the trollface is a recognizable image of Internet memes and culture. Ramirez has used his creation, registered with the United States Copyright Office in 2010, to gain over $100,000 in licensing fees, settlements, and other payouts. The video game Meme Run for Nintendo's Wii U console was taken down for having the trollface as the main character.

Another character that is frequently used in rage comics is the "Y U NO" (shorthand for "why you no") guy, a character with a big round head, deep wrinkles, thin arms and a look of intense annoyance. He is also often used in image macro form. He was used on a billboard on the 101 to advertise a chat platform in 2011 and on the cover of The Gap in 2012.

In China, rage comics are known as Bàozǒu Mànhuà (Chinese: 暴走漫画), shortened to Baoman (Chinese: 暴漫). They contain many of the same characters as Western rage comics but also contain original characters. Baoman gained widespread online popularity in China when artist Wang Nima created the website baozoumanhua.com. By 2012, the website received between 5000 and 8000 daily comic submissions. In 2018, the website was banned because creator Wang Nima made jokes about Chinese military heroes such as Ye Ting and Dong Cunrui. The social media site Weibo also terminated 16 accounts related to rage comics. In 2018, Netflix released the film Next Gen, which is an adaptation of one of Wang Nima's rage comics titled 7723.

== See also ==
- Baozou
- List of Internet memes
- Wojak – a similar meme
