= Wojak =

Internet meme

- Original, generic appearance of Wojak
- First appearance: Vichan; 2009
- Created by: Unknown

In-universe information
- Alias: Feels Guy
- Species: Human
- Gender: Male

Wojak (from Polish wojak, pronounced [ˈvɔjak], loosely 'soldier' or 'fighter'), also known as Feels Guy, is an Internet meme that is, in its original form, a simple, black-outlined cartoon drawing of a bald man with a wistful expression.

The meme subsequently grew in popularity on 4chan, where the character became associated with phrases such as "I know that feel, bro", "that feel", and "that feel when".

== History ==
The meme first appeared on the Polish imageboard Vichan with the name ciepłatwarz.jpg (warmface.jpg). The earliest archived appearance was posted on 16 December 2009 on the meme sharing website Sad and Useless. Intelligencer describes Wojak's expression as "pained but dealing with it". A user named "Wojak" shared the image on German imageboard Krautchan in 2010, which started the meme. The image spread to many imageboards, including 4chan, where by 2011, an image of two Wojaks hugging each other under the caption "I know that feel bro" gained popularity.

Wojak was also paired with the template phrase "that feel" or "that feel when", often shortened to "tfw" or ">tfw".

Some variants paired him with the character Pepe the Frog (with catchphrases "feels good man" or "feels bad man"), in what Brian Feldman describes as a "platonic romance within the memescape".

== Variants ==
=== NPC ===
In October 2018, a Wojak with a gray face, pointy nose and blank, emotionless facial expression, dubbed "NPC Wojak", became a popular visual representation for people who cannot think for themselves or make their own decisions, comparing them to non-player characters – computer-automated characters within a video game. NPC Wojak has gained online notoriety. The meme gained media attention, initially in Kotaku and The New York Times, due to its usage in parodying the supposed herd mentality of American liberals. This usage of the meme has been attributed to Donald Trump supporters. About 1,500 Twitter accounts falsely posing as liberal activists with the NPC meme as a profile picture were suspended for spreading misinformation about the 2018 United States elections. On 13 January 2019, a conservative art collective known as "The Faction" hijacked a billboard for Real Time with Bill Maher, replacing Maher's image with that of the NPC Wojak.

=== Coomer ===
In November 2019, the "Coomer" Wojak picked up in popularity with the "No Nut November" trend. The Coomer depicts a Wojak edit with unkempt hair, red rimmed eyes, and an untidy beard, sporting a lascivious grin. This Wojak is sometimes depicted with a skinny frame, and a large, muscular right arm resulting from excessive masturbation. It is generally understood to represent someone with a pornography addiction. Much of this meme's popularity can be attributed to the "Coomer Pledge", a viral internet trend which dared people to abstain from masturbation for all of November, and change their profile picture to an image of the Coomer if they were to fail.

=== Doomer ===
The doomer is an image macro and character archetype that first appeared on 4chan. The image typically depicts Wojak wearing a black watch cap and a black hooded sweatshirt, with dark circles under his eyes, while smoking a cigarette. The archetype often embodies nihilism, clinical depression, hopelessness, and despair, with a belief in the incipient end of the world to causes ranging from climate apocalypse, to peak oil, to alcoholism, to (more locally) opioid addiction. The meme first appeared on 4chan's /r9k/ board in September 2018.

A related meme format, "doomer girl", began appearing on 4chan in January 2020, and it soon moved to other online communities, including Reddit and Tumblr, often by women claiming it from its 4chan origins. This format is described by The Atlantic as "a quickly sketched cartoon woman with black hair, black clothes, and sad eyes ringed with red makeup". The doomer girl character is often associated with the e-girl and alternative subcultures. The character often appears in image macros interacting with the original doomer character. The format is often compared to rage comics.

=== Soyjak ===
Soyjak, a portmanteau of "soy" and "wojak", is a variation of Wojak that combines Wojak-style illustrations with additional features to allude to a soy boy, such as a gaping "cuckface" with an excited expression, glasses, stubble, and a balding head. It is commonly paired with the masculine Gigachad meme; an active imageboard called soyjak.party, colloquially known as "the sharty", dedicated to posting soyjaks and creating new ones using photos of bald men with beards was created in September 2020.

=== Chudjak ===
Chudjak is a variation of Wojak based on the Chud meme, which derives from a photo of Patrick Crusius, the perpetrator of the 2019 El Paso Walmart shooting. The Chudjak is depicted with a large bulbous nose, furrowed eyebrows, glasses and an irate expression. It originally appeared on 4chan where it was used to mock users of /pol/ for their far-right tendencies (referring to them as Chuds).

=== Big Brain ===
The Big Brain Wojak is a variation of Wojak with glasses, a significantly enlarged head, and visible brain wrinkles. The most common form of Big Brain Wojak has a head so comically large that the Wojak sits on it like a chair. The meme was initially used on 4chan to mock others' political or controversial opinions. It is typically used online when attempting to call out those who are pretentious or wannabe intellectuals. There are many subsequent versions of the big brain meme, typically with slightly varying messages. The opposite of the Big Brain Wojak is the Brainlet Wojak, depicted with a tiny bump of a brain on top of a small head, often used to portray self-described intellectuals.

=== Tradwife and Wifejak ===
The "tradwife" or "trad girl" Wojak depicts a blonde woman in a blue dress with a daisy pattern print. The "Tradwife" Wojak specifically embodies traditional gender roles and conservative values, often depicted as a woman dressed in vintage or modest clothing, emphasizing homemaking, traditional family values, and a rejection of modern feminist ideals.

The "Wifejak" Wojak is a redhead Wojak designed to embody stereotypical traits associated with "typical wife behavior". In the memes, the character usually says a message that parodies what a stereotypical wife may say, such as "I'm cold" or "I just threw 30 cardboard boxes into the garage".

== See also ==
- Polandball – another meme which originated on Krautchan to make fun of the user Wojak before spreading to the English-speaking world
- Rage comic – a similar meme which also uses copies of black-and-white Microsoft Paint illustrations
- Meme Man – a 3D render of a face often used in surreal memes and reaction images
- Trollface – a similar internet meme character
