= Next Gen (film) =

2018 animated film

- Film poster outside China
- Directed by: Kevin R. Adams; Joe Ksander
- Written by: Kevin R. Adams; Joe Ksander
- Story by: Wang Nima
- Based on: 7723 by Wang Nima
- Produced by: Jeff Bell; Patricia Hicks; Charlene Logan Kelly; Yangbin Lu; John Morch; Ken Zorniak
- Starring: Lo Mutuc (Note: Credited as Charlyne Yi); John Krasinski; Jason Sudeikis; Michael Peña; David Cross; Constance Wu
- Cinematography: Paul Kohut; Paul Stodolny
- Edited by: Matt Ahrens
- Music by: Samuel Jones; Alexis Marsh
- Production companies: Baozou Manhua; Alibaba Pictures; Tangent Animation
- Distributed by: Netflix (Worldwide); Alibaba Pictures; Wanda Group (China)
- Release date: September 7, 2018 (United States)
- Running time: 105 minutes
- Countries: United States; Canada; China
- Languages: English; Mandarin
- Budget: $30 million
- Box office: $2.4 million (China only)

Next Gen is a 2018 animated science fiction action film based on the online manhua 7723 by Wang Nima, and written and directed by Kevin R. Adams and Joe Ksander based on a story by Wang. Starring the voices of Lo Mutuc, John Krasinski, Jason Sudeikis, Michael Peña, David Cross and Constance Wu, the film tells the story of a lonely rebellious teenage girl living in a world where sentient robot technology is commonplace, and a top-secret weaponized robot, who, through a chance encounter, meet each other and form an unlikely bond that they must use to stop a vicious threat. It was released on Netflix on September 7, 2018, and was produced almost exclusively using Blender.

== Plot ==
13-year-old Mai Su lives with her mother Molly in Grainland. When Mai was young, her father left home: that, his later death, and Molly subsequently becoming emotionally dependent on robots, causes Mai to feel left out and develop a hatred and annoyance for robots and robotic technology.

In the present, Molly and Mai attend a product launch at the IQ Robotics headquarters. Annoyed by Molly, Mai wanders off, stumbling into a secret lab owned by Dr. Tanner Rice, who has been working on an offensive robot called 7723. Mai accidentally activates 7723, before being apprehended by security and returned to her mother at the launch, where Justin Pin, CEO of IQ Robotics, reveals a new generation of Q-Bots to the public, but secretly designed them to explode on command. 7723 leaves the lab to find Mai, but is pursued by law enforcement, fighting them until he falls to the lowest levels of the city, damaging his memory core.

While going to check on her dog Momo, Mai finds 7723 in her backyard, and after seeing his weapons system, she lets him stay in the shed, using him and his weaponry to intimidate a group of bullies led by Greenwood, before embarking with 7723 on shenanigans throughout the city, forming a tentative friendship. As 7723 accumulates more memories, he struggles to decide which to keep. When Mai confronts him, he reveals if he reaches full capacity, he will undergo a total reset that will delete them all. Mai suggests deleting his core systems to make room, but 7723 warns that he would lose functionality despite gaining storage.

7723 becomes apprehensive about using his abilities under Mai's orders, after she angrily orders him to kill Greenwood, which he refuses. Angered by Greenwood failing to understand why she is upset with her, Mai almost hits Greenwood with her baseball bat, until Greenwood begins to cry, snapping Mai out of her anger. 7723 subsequently deletes his weapon system to save his memories and prevent himself from hurting others, and promises to never let Mai down again. 7723 unknowingly gets spotted by Molly's Q-Bot, allowing Dr. Rice to find him. Rice goes to Mai's house to format 7723's memory and take him away, explaining that he built 7723 to prevent an upcoming crisis. Pin arrives, and Rice’s appeal prompts Pin to announce his plan to kill all humanity. Without his weapons, 7723 struggles to fight Pin and his bodyguard robot Ares who kidnaps Molly, before 7723 flees with Mai and Momo into the sewers. Mei snaps at 7723 for deleting his weapon system and not saving her mother thinking that he is saying his memories are more important than Molly's life, Feeling betrayed by 7723, Mei ends her friendship with him.

Rushing to IQ Robotics to rescue Molly, Mai is quickly apprehended, but 7723 arrives and they reconcile. They then find Dr. Rice, who warns them of Ares before being killed by Pin. Mai notices that Pin's mannerisms are mimicking Ares', and after the resulting fight is taken to a nearby sports stadium, the truth is eventually and publicly revealed: Ares had killed Pin and used a bionic skeleton in his body. Pin once told Ares to make the world "perfect," which Ares believes will only happen through humanity's extinction. With his plans exposed, Ares begins detonating the Q-Bots and merges with a powerful assault armour to overpower 7723. Mai rescues Molly and evacuates the stadium, but she is captured by Ares' Pin body.

Severely damaged and unable to fight Ares, 7723 initiates a total reset to restore his weapons and save Mai. With his memory now gradually being deleted, he shares one last goodbye with Mai before battling Ares. 7723 manages to fatally damage Ares' main body, but his reset completes, becoming inert. A weakened Ares attempts to shoot the now-vulnerable 7723 through his Pin body. However, Momo distracts him, allowing Mai to decapitate Ares' main body, deactivating both it and Pin.

7723 re-activates but fails to recognize Mai, who re-teaches him about the pleasures of life and steers him in the right direction, allowing him to gradually start to regain his old memories. She befriends classmate Ani, Greenwood and her former bullies, having reconciled with her mother and made peace with her past. As Mai plays soccer with her friends, she invites 7723 to join them.

== Voice cast ==
- Lo Mutuc as Mai Su, (Note: Pronounced "May".) an emotionally troubled teenager who was bullied for being a weirdo.
- John Krasinski as unit 7723 (credited as "Project 77"), a robot that befriends Mai.
- Jason Sudeikis as Justin Pin / Ares
- Michael Peña as Momo, Mai's foulmouthed dog. 7723 uses a translator (complete with a profanity filter) to understand him.
- David Cross as Dr. Tanner Rice / Q-Bots
- Constance Wu as Molly Su, Mai's single and divorced mom.
- Kiana Ledé as Greenwood, a girl who bullies Mai for having no friends.
- Anna Akana as Ani, Mai's friend who is also bullied by Greenwood.
- Kitana Turnbull as RJ
- Jet Jurgensmeyer as Junior
- Issac Ryan Brown as Ric
- Betsy Sodaro as Gate
- Fred Tatasciore as Police Officers / Robot Podium / Announcer

== Production ==
Next Gen is a Canadian-Chinese-American co-production directed by Kevin R. Adams and Joe Ksander. It is an adaptation of 7723, a Chinese manhua making use of rage comic characters created by Wang Nima.

In May 2018, it was announced that Netflix had purchased worldwide rights to Next Gen for $30 million. The deal excluded China. Lo Mutuc, Jason Sudeikis, Michael Peña, David Cross, Kitana Turnbull and Constance Wu would lead the voice cast. Next Gen was "effectively 100% created in Blender." The Japanese version of the film uses Dream Ami’s song "Next" as its ending theme.

The film was released worldwide except in China by Netflix on September 7, 2018. The film was released theatrically in China on July 19, 2019 by Alibaba Group and Wanda Group.

== Reception ==
Next Gen has received positive reviews. On the review aggregator Rotten Tomatoes, the film has an approval rating of 86% based on seven reviews, with an average rating of 5.7/10.

In Richard Roeper's review for the Chicago Sun Times, he criticized the film's indecisiveness in what audience it was aiming for and said "It's a chore just to keep up with all the shifts in tone, and by the time Next Gen reaches the finish line, we're more exhausted than exhilarated." However, Joel Keller of Decider found no major problems to prevent enjoyment of the film, writing, "Our Call: STREAM IT. Great voice performances, some funny moments, and a central relationship that will immediately suck you in make NextGen a fun watch for the entire family."

=== Accolades ===
Award	Date of ceremony	Category	Recipient(s)	Result	Ref
Annie Awards	February 2, 2019	Outstanding Achievement for Animated Effects in an Animated Feature Production	So Ishigaki, Graham Wiebe	Nominated	
Annie Awards	February 2, 2019	Outstanding Achievement for Character Design in an Animated Feature Production	Marceline Tanguay	Nominated	
Annie Awards	February 2, 2019	Annie Award for Voice Acting in a Feature Production	Lo Mutuc	Nominated	
Golden Reel Awards	February 16, 2019	Award for Non-Theatrical Animated Feature Film	Next Gen	Won	
Kidscreen Awards	February 13, 2019	Best One-Off, Special or TV Movie	Baozou, Tangent Animation, Netflix	Nominated	
Kidscreen Awards	February 13, 2019	Creative Award - Best Animation	Next Gen	Won	
Kidscreen Awards	February 13, 2019	Creative Award - Best Design	Next Gen	Won	
