= Neckbeard =

Neckbeard or neck beard may refer to:

- Neckbeard (facial hairstyle), a facial hairstyle that mostly covers the neck, as opposed to other parts of the face
- Neckbeard (slang), a pejorative term for men, based on a stereotype of young men with poor facial grooming
