= Trollface =

Rage comic character and internet meme

- Rendition of the original Trollface by Carlos Ramirez.
- First appearance: DeviantArt
- Created by: Carlos Ramirez

In-universe information
- Gender: Male

Trollface or Troll Face is a rage comic meme image of a character donning a mischievous smile, used to symbolize internet trolls and trolling. It is one of the oldest and most widely known rage comic faces.

== History ==
Trollface was drawn in Microsoft Paint on September 19, 2008, by Carlos Ramirez, an 18-year-old Oakland college student. The image was published on Ramirez's DeviantArt page, "Whynne", as part of a rage comic titled Trolls, about the pointless nature of trolling. Ramirez posted the image to the imageboard website 4chan, where other users began to share it. In the following months, Ramirez's drawing quickly gained traction on 4chan as the universal emoticon of an internet troll and a versatile rage comic character. From 4chan, Trollface spread to Reddit and Urban Dictionary in 2009, eventually reaching other internet image-sharing sites such as Imgur and Facebook. In March 2021, Ramirez announced his intention to sell a non-fungible token for Trollface.

== Usage ==
Trollface shows an internet troll, someone who annoys others on the internet for their own amusement. The original comic by Ramirez mocked trolls; however, the image is widely used by those who know how to troll and prank. Trollface has been described as the internet equivalent of the children's taunt "nyah nyah nyah nyah nyah nyah" or sticking one's tongue out.

== Copyright ==
On April 8, 2015, Kotaku ran an in-depth interview article with Ramirez about his now-iconic rage comic character. In the article, Ramirez estimated that since registering Trolls with the United States Copyright Office on July 27, 2010, he had earned more than $100,000 in licensing fees and other payouts associated with Trollface, including from licensing for shirts emblazoned with the face being sold by the retail chain Hot Topic, with monthly revenues reaching as high as $15,000 at its peak. In addition, Ramirez offered a backstory behind the removal of the video game Meme Run for Wii U for copyright infringement for including Trollface as the main character. Trollface is protected by copyright, but is not trademarked.

== Impact ==
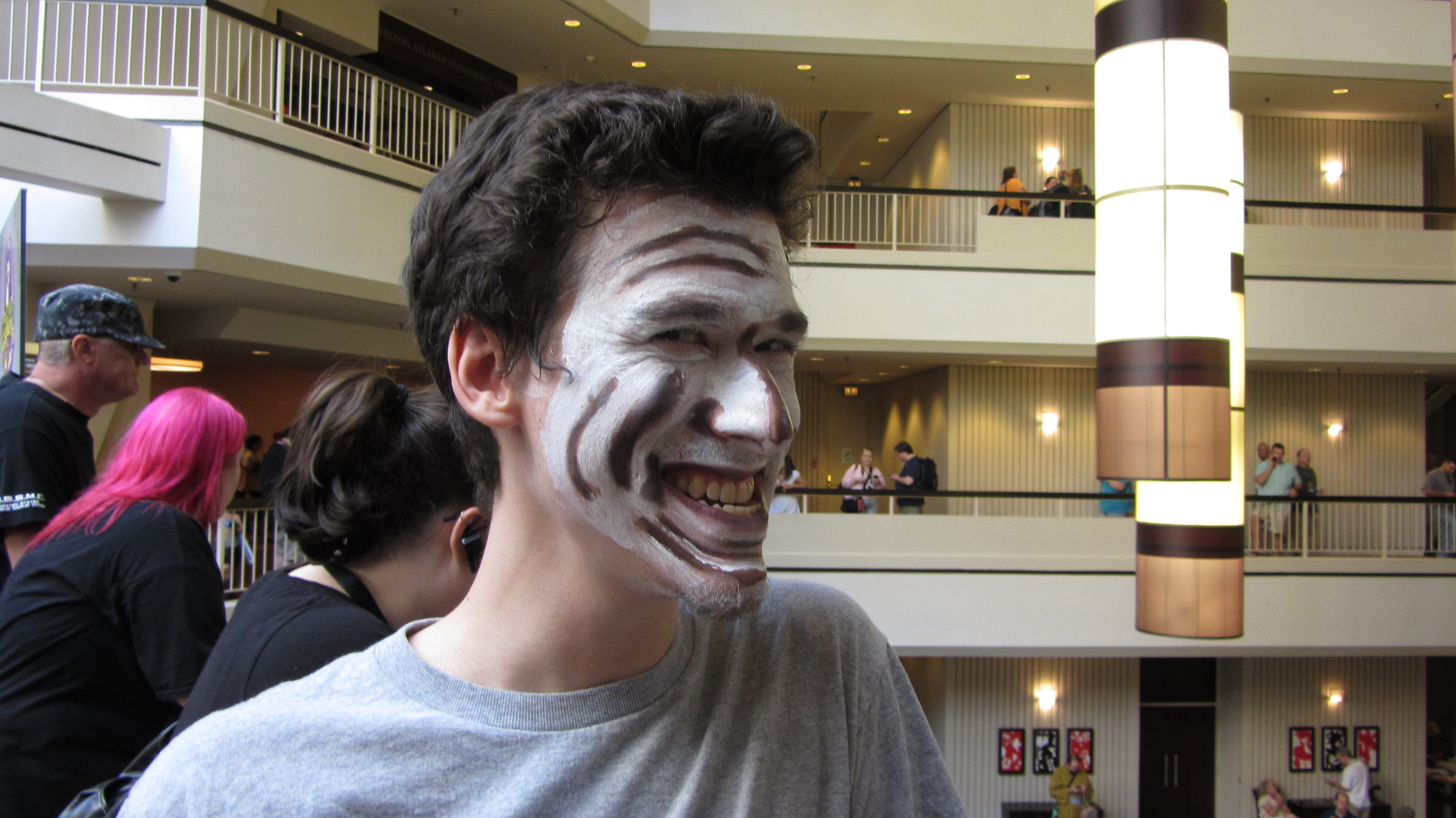
Man in Trollface makeup at Dragon Con 2011

Trollface was described by La Tercera as "the father of memes". A bust of Trollface was exhibited at the Mexico City museum Museo del Meme. In March 2012, a viral video showed a banner emblazoned with Trollface and the word "Problem?" being used by fans of the Turkish Second League football team Eskişehirspor to protest a rule change. In the Black Mirror episode "Shut Up and Dance", the blackmailers send Trollface photographs after they leak the victims' secrets in spite of their compliance.

In February 2021, Rebecca Black released a remix of her 2011 song "Friday" to celebrate its 10th anniversary, with the song's music video featuring several rage comic characters, including Trollface. In March 2022, as a reaction to the Russian invasion of Ukraine, hackers intercepted the Russian military radio frequencies and broadcast a series of trollfaces on military radio transmissions.

== See also ==
- Memes – Cultural idea that spreads through imitation
- Rage comics – Internet meme
