= Chud (pejorative) =

Pejorative term for the far-right

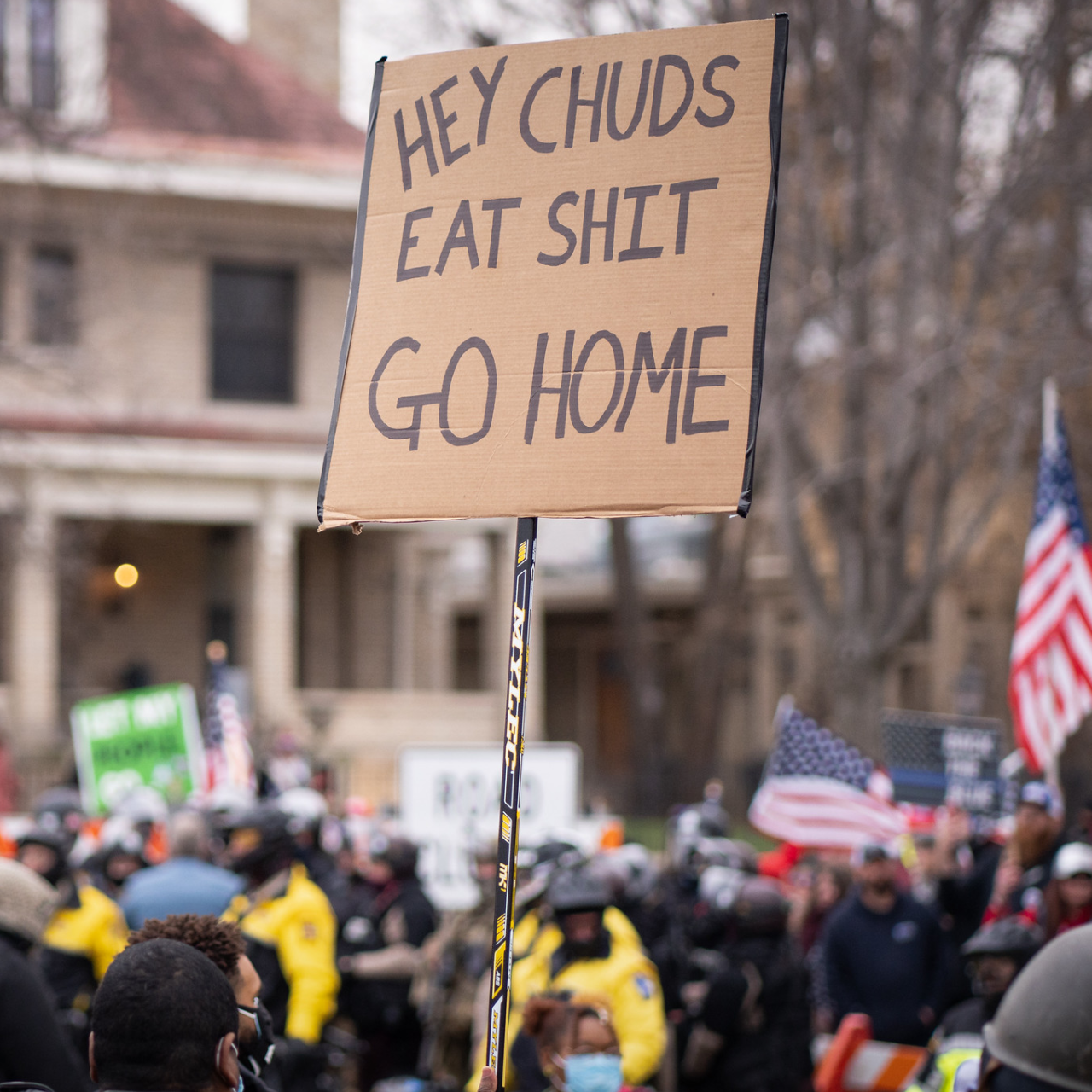
A protester's sign using the word, Minneapolis, December 2020

In internet culture, chud is a slang term for someone with far-right political views, sometimes in a pejorative sense. The term is often paired with a sketch picture of a character known as the Chudjak, a variant of the Wojak based on far-right mass murderer Patrick Crusius. In the mid-2020s, the term lost its political connotation in popular use, referring more generally to a person who is a loser or disappointment. The term is sometimes contrasted with the Chad meme, although not having any relation, despite similar pronunciation.

== Etymology ==
The term originates from the 1984 movie C.H.U.D. In the film, the acronym refers to a group of humanoid, flesh-eating monsters that were once humans, but mutated due to radioactive waste. The monsters in this film are called "Cannibalistic Humanoid Underground Dwellers", i.e. C.H.U.D. While the word may have started pejorative use in 2003 to describe any repulsive person, its usage shifted as it became popular in the late 2010s on sites such as Twitter, Soyjak.party, and Reddit, after the podcast Chapo Trap House frequently used it to describe those who they perceive to be ignorant or far-right.

As the word grew in popularity, it also gained an additional non-political connotation. At a "Chud-off" competition held at Monroe Park in Richmond, Virginia, a participant referred to as the "Chudnana" described the non-political meaning of the word as "someone who stays inside, never does anything with their life, and is unemployed and dumb".

== Chudjak ==
A Chudjak meme satirizing the slogan "The West Has Fallen"

Chudjak, formerly known as Poljak or Le /pol/ Face, is a variation of the Wojak internet meme named after the term chud. He is depicted with short black hair, furrowing eyebrows, square-rimmed glasses, and a receding chin. He is designed to bear resemblance to, and make fun of, the far-right mass murderer Patrick Crusius and users of the 4chan board /pol/. The Chudjak character has been used in leftist, far-right, and non-political spaces, similar to the word he is named after.

One of the most popular memes with the character is the Nothing Ever Happens reaction image, which features the Chudjak betting all his chips in a poker game that nothing will happen. The catchphrase used in the meme originated from 2012 on 4chan's /pol/ board. It is commonly used in political posts to reject either alarmism or a warning that will likely not carry any consequences. Sometimes, it is used in an ironic sense.

The phrase "The West Has Fallen; Billions Must Die" is commonly associated with the Chudjak and has been used as a hate slogan by militant accelerationists and other race supremacists. The character has also been associated with the hate symbol "TND".

== See also ==
- Fascist (insult)
- Gammon (insult)
- Angry white male
- China's final warning – an idiom similar to Nothing Ever Happens
- Chud the Builder – a far right streamer
- Incel
