= Soy boy =

Pejorative for men perceived as feminine

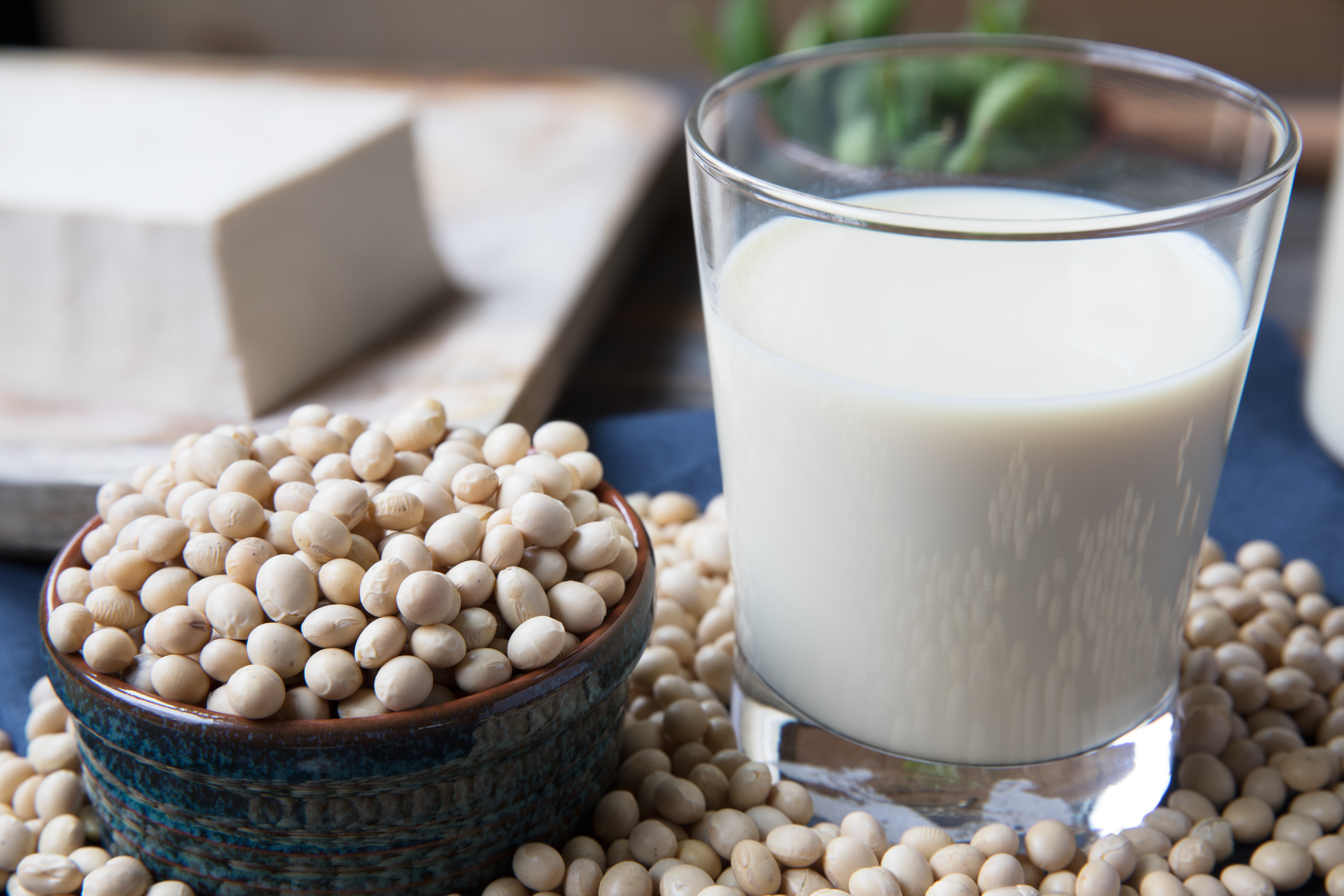
Soy beans and soy milk

Soy boy is a derogatory term sometimes used in online communities to describe men perceived to be lacking masculine characteristics. The term has been compared to the slang terms cuck (derived from cuckold), nu-male, and low-T ("low testosterone")—terms sometimes used as insults for male femininity in the manosphere. It is typically used as an insult aimed towards leftist men.

The term is based on the presence of the phytoestrogen isoflavone in soybeans, which has led some to claim that soy products feminize men who consume them, although there is no evidence supporting the correlation between consumption of soy phytoestrogens and testosterone or estrogen levels, or sperm quality.

== Usage ==
The term is often used as an epithet by internet trolls and alt-right conspiracy theorists, targeting men who are perceived as weak, effeminate, or politically left-wing. Historically, Western scholars often characterized dairy milk as one of the causes of the success and racial superiority of Northern European societies. In contrast, cultures subsisting on a predominantly plant-based diet, such as India and China, were described as "intellectually weak" and "effeminate".

The exact origin of the term in its modern usage is unclear, though earlier pop culture occurrences include a toy car license plate reading "#1 SOY BOY" in Katy Perry's April, 2008 music video for "Ur So Gay". Online political usage is variously attributed to 4chan's /pol/ board, YouTube political commentator James Allsup, and far-right conspiracy theorist Mike Cernovich. It has been used and popularized by people such as Alex Jones, Roosh Valizadeh, and Paul Joseph Watson. In February 2017, shortly after President Donald Trump's inauguration, alt-right protesters interrupted Shia LeBeouf's anti-Trump art installation He Will Not Divide Us, expressing anti-Semitic, racist, sexist, and homophobic views while carrying cartons of dairy milk and denigrating plant-based milk and food products. Shortly after, the hashtags #MilkTwitter and #SoyBoy became viral on Twitter.

Far-right conspiracy theorists have claimed that excess soy consumption can result in exaggerated facial expressions due to a lack of testosterone, called a "soy face" or a "Soylent grin", a reference to a soy protein-based meal replacement shake.

== Biology ==
Soy products contain high amounts of phytoestrogens. As they are structurally similar to estradiol (the major female sex hormone) and have activity at the estrogen receptor, early research suggested that it may act as an endocrine disruptor that adversely affects health. An article written in the 1970s claimed that soy could disrupt hormone balance which initially started the bad reputation. Since then, concerns have been raised that it may act as an endocrine disruptor that adversely affects health. The Harvard School of Health, however, notes that "there are many factors that make it difficult to construct blanket statements about the health effects of soy"; in the late 2010s and early 2020s a sizeable amount of research and scientific reviews further debunked claims.

It is unclear if phytoestrogens have any effect on male physiology, with conflicting results about the potential effects of isoflavones (a kind of phytoestrogen) originating from soy. Some studies showed that isoflavone supplementation had a positive effect on sperm concentration, count, or motility, and increased ejaculate volume. Furthermore, while there is some evidence that phytoestrogens may affect male fertility, more recent reviews of available studies found no link, and instead suggests that healthier diets such as the Mediterranean diet might have a positive effect on male fertility. Several review studies have not found any effect of phytoestrogens on sperm quality or reproductive hormone levels. Neither isoflavones nor soy have been shown to affect male reproductive hormones in healthy individuals.

Soy is rich in nutrients and likely to provide health benefits, especially when it replaces red or processed meat. Avoidance of red and processed meat was found to lower risk of developing erectile dysfunction. Higher soy intake is also associated with lower risk for prostate cancer. Studies show that plant-based diets do not compromise muscular strength.

== See also ==
- Beta male (slang)
- Cuckold – Husband of an adulterous wife
- Femboy – Slang term used for a feminine male
- Incel – Online subculture
- Low-T – Diminished activity of the gonads
- Sissy – Pejorative slur used against effeminate boys and men
- Soyjak – Internet memes pertaining to soy boys
- Performative male – 2025 internet meme
