= Neckbeard (slang) =

Pejorative term and stereotype for men

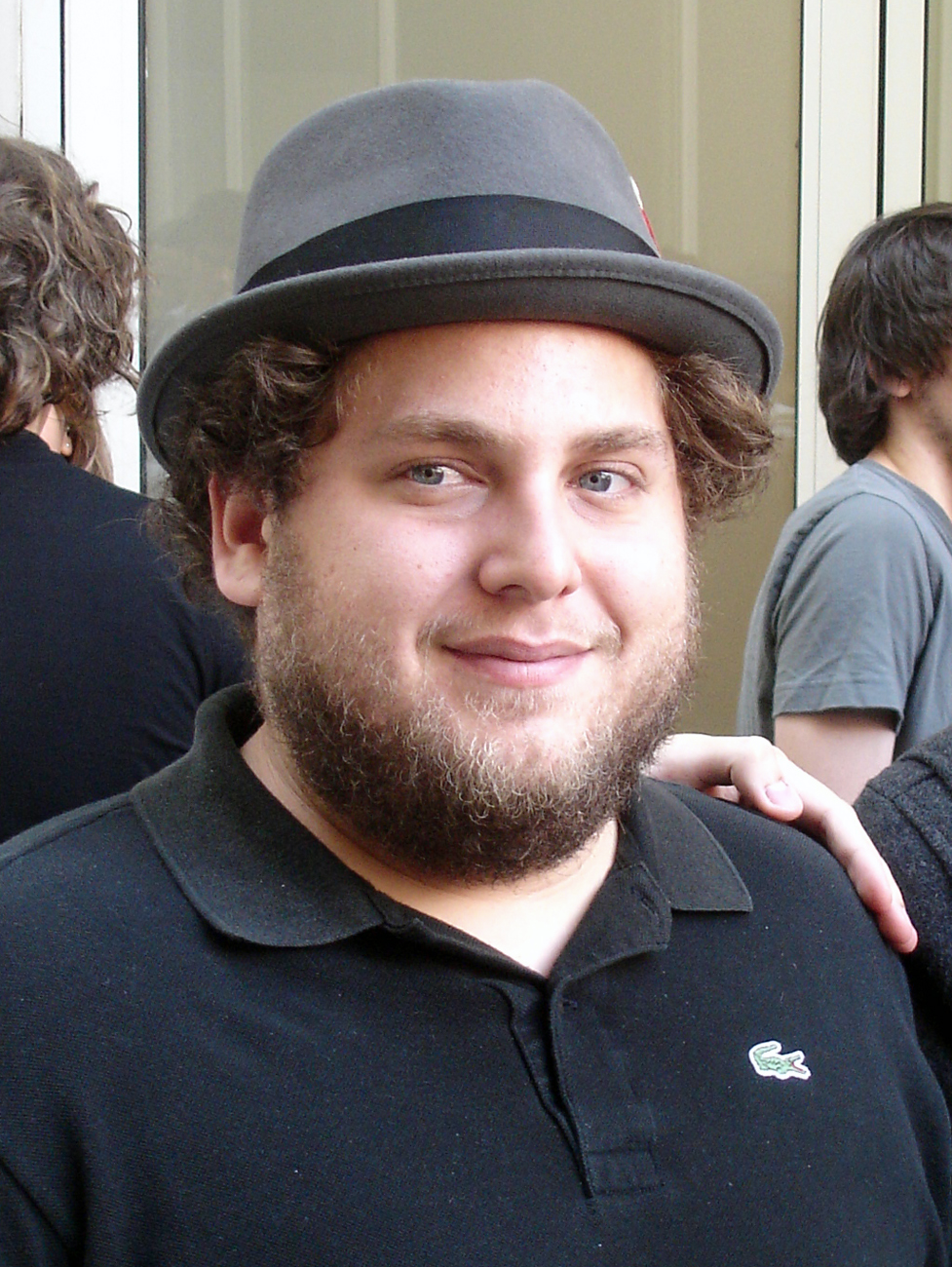
This photo of Jonah Hill has been used online to represent the neckbeard stereotype.

"Neckbeard" is a pejorative term and stereotype for a man who exhibits characteristics such as social awkwardness, underachievement, and pretentiousness. The term is derived from the neck beard style of facial hair, wearers of which may neglect social norms of facial hair care and identify with nerd, gamer, or geek subcultures. The term has also been associated with anti-feminist internet users.

== Examples ==
- Comic Book Guy from The Simpsons is considered by some as a neckbeard due to his appearance, pretentiousness, and love for comic books.
- The character Plague in The Girl with the Dragon Tattoo is also considered a neckbeard. Despite being female, the titular protagonist Lisbeth Salander also shares some traits associated with the stereotype.
- In the South Park episode "Make Love, Not Warcraft", there is a neckbeard named Jenkins who spends seemingly all of his time playing the online role-playing game World of Warcraft, repeatedly travelling around and killing other players' characters. The CEOs of Blizzard Entertainment describe him as having "absolutely no life".
- Hal Stewart (or Tighten) from the 2010 film Megamind has been regarded by some as someone who fits the description of a neckbeard, due to his lack of any achievement, the slovenly state of his small apartment, his video game hobby, his obsessive fixation on Roxanne Ritchi, and his anger when matters do not go his way.

== See also ==
- Nerd
- Geek
- Chud (pejorative)
