= Meme Run =

2014 endless runner video game

- Developer: Ninja Pig Studios
- Publisher: Ninja Pig Studios
- Engine: Unity
- Platform: Wii U
- Release: December 18, 2014
- Genre: Endless runner
- Mode: Single-player

Meme Run is an endless running video game created by American indie developer Ninja Pig Studios for the Wii U console's eShop service. The game and its Miiverse community features extensive use of Internet memes; for example, the player character is a stick figure with a trollface for a head, and the levels are made up of Lenny faces. The game was designed to appeal to meme fans, hardcore, and casual audiences, but was widely criticized before and after its release for its perceived low quality.

The game was removed from the Nintendo eShop and the Miiverse community for the game was deleted on March 3, 2015, after a copyright claim by artist Carlos "Whynne" Ramirez due to unlicensed use of the trollface by the developers.

== Gameplay ==
Trollface jumping over a pit with various other memes in the background

In Meme Run, the player controls a stick figure with a trollface for a head. The character runs through procedurally generated 2D levels, jumping over and sliding under obstacles, until it is trapped between the continually sliding screen and an obstacle or falls into a bottomless pit. The player's total of "swag points" continually increases, and after a run, the player can post their high score to Miiverse. The levels are made up of the repeated "Lenny face" Internet meme, and other memes appear throughout the game, such as a "wombo combo!" scream when the player collects an item—a reference to a Super Smash Bros. Melee match recording on YouTube.

== Development and release ==
Meme Run was developed by Ninja Pig Studios, a small indie outfit consisting of 20 year old developer Jordan Schuetz and his brother. The game contains copious use of memes, described as an "Internet meme-infused infinite runner (Yes, really)" by Joystiq. It was intended to appeal to both hardcore and casual gaming audiences by featuring both simple, intuitive controls and substantial difficulty once the character has run far enough.

The game was widely criticized before its release; in response, Schuetz responded that it was a parody intended to "troll" users and called it "Game of the Year 2014". However, Schuetz's friends in college enjoyed the game, and its description contains the quote "Tyrone rated this game 8/8 which means it's not b8 so come play m8." It was released on December 18, 2014, for the Wii U's eShop online service, their second eShop release after the poorly received puzzle game IQ Test. Schuetz has stated that Ninja Pig's future plans are "a secret".

On January 5, 2015, Meme Run was put on Steam Greenlight in an attempt to release the game on Steam, which never came to fruition due to the shutdown of Steam Greenlight on June 6, 2017.

On January 19, 2015, "Bigley Mode" was added. By pressing B on the main menu, the user would be able to play as a character known as Bigley, an in-joke within the Miiverse community referencing a drawing within that community relating to the Metroid character Ridley and the reasons given for his absence from the video games Super Smash Bros. for Nintendo 3DS and Wii U.

On March 3, 2015, Meme Run was pulled from the Wii U eShop with no public announcement. Its Miiverse community page was also taken down. A Reddit post purporting to be the copyright holder of the "trollface" meme claimed he sent a DMCA notice to Nintendo to take down Meme Run. According to Schuetz, Meme Run failed Nintendo's legal tests at least three times.

== Reception ==
Reception

Review scores
Publication	Score
Nintendo Life	1/10
Nintendo News	2/5
Nintendo Enthusiast	2/10

Prior to release, Mark Serrels of Kotaku called the game "terrifying" and opined that "just watching this video game being played is a genuine insight into what it is to be insane." The game was negatively received by critics upon release. Nintendo Life staff writer Lee Meyer called it possibly "one of the worst releases on any gaming platform this year" and stating that it was certainly not worth its price of US$4.99. Meyer found the copious use of memes to be unpleasant and jarring and also criticized the finicky controls. He suggested that its intention may have been to lampoon the proliferation of banal Internet memes, but felt that it had not succeeded.

== Legacy ==
On July 23, 2020, a sequel was released for Windows, macOS, and PlayStation 4 titled Meme Run 2. It has similar gameplay to the original but with non-copyrighted content.
