= List of Weed volumes =

Weed was written and illustrated by Yoshihiro Takahashi. It is a sequel to his 1980s series Silver Fang -The Shooting Star Gin-, and follows the son of Gin, the title character from the original series. It began serialization in Weekly Manga Goraku magazine in 1999. The Japanese publisher Nihon Bungeisha released the series in collected volumes from January 2000 to September 2009. Cumulatively, 60 volumes were published. In October 2006, Nihon Bungeisha released the first volume of a reprinted edition of Weed. The company has released 22 volumes of the reprint edition, with the latest published in December 2007. The American company ComicsOne licensed the series for release in the United States and Canada in 2000 with the first three volumes released between March and June 2001. Additionally, they provided an Adobe Digital Editions e-book version. ComicsOne later went bankrupt. American publisher DrMaster acquired the rights to some of ComicsOne's titles, but not Weed. While the physical copies are out-of-print, the e-book version is still available. Under their G-Comics imprint, Nihon Bungeisha released several Weed omnibus editions labeled as "specials". A series of three specials were released in April 2004 called Gajō no Kettō Hen (牙城の血闘編). Throughout 2009 and 2010, another set of eight "specials" were produced: Tabidachi Hen (September 2009), Senshi no Shōmei Hen (October 2009), Inuzoku no Tsutome Hen (November 2009), Otoko no Yakusoku Hen (December 2009), Taiman Shōbu Hen (January 2010), Taishō no Utsuwa Hen (February 2010), Dōshu Taiketsu Hen (March 2010), and Uketsuga Reshi Kiba Hen (April 2010).

== Volume list ==
=== Weed ===
| No. | Original release date | Original ISBN | English release date | English ISBN |
|---|---|---|---|---|
| 01 | January 1, 2000 | 978-4-537-09891-4 | March 2001 | 978-1-58899-081-5 |
| 02 | March 1, 2000 | 978-4-537-09907-2 | April 2001 | 978-1-58899-082-2 |
| 03 | April 1, 2000 | 978-4-537-09914-0 | June 2001 | 978-1-58899-083-9 |
| 04 | July 1, 2000 | 978-4-537-09928-7 | | |
| 05 | September 1, 2000 | 978-4-537-09943-0 | | |
| 06 | November 1, 2000 | 978-4-537-09955-3 | | |
| 07 | January 1, 2001 | 978-4-537-09969-0 | | |
| 08 | March 1, 2001 | 978-4-537-09982-9 | | |
| 09 | May 1, 2001 | 978-4-537-09994-2 | | |
| 10 | July 1, 2001 | 978-4-537-10009-9 | | |
| 11 | September 1, 2001 | 978-4-537-10024-2 | | |
| 12 | November 1, 2001 | 978-4-537-10040-2 | | |
| 13 | January 1, 2002 | 978-4-537-10052-5 | | |
| 14 | March 8, 2002 | 978-4-537-10068-6 | | |
| 15 | May 9, 2002 | 978-4-537-10084-6 | | |
| 16 | July 9, 2002 | 978-4-537-10100-3 | | |
| 17 | September 1, 2002 | 978-4-537-10116-4 | | |
| 18 | November 7, 2002 | 978-4-537-10135-5 | | |
| 19 | January 9, 2003 | 978-4-537-10155-3 | | |
| 20 | March 1, 2003 | 978-4-537-10173-7 | | |
| 21 | May 9, 2003 | 978-4-537-10192-8 | | |
| 22 | July 9, 2003 | 978-4-537-10208-6 | | |
| 23 | September 9, 2003 | 978-4-537-10225-3 | | |
| 24 | November 7, 2003 | 978-4-537-10242-0 | | |
| 25 | January 9, 2004 | 978-4-537-10262-8 | | |
| 26 | March 9, 2004 | 978-4-537-10278-9 | | |
| 27 | May 7, 2004 | 978-4-537-10294-9 | | |
| 28 | July 8, 2004 | 978-4-537-10312-0 | | |
| 29 | September 9, 2004 | 978-4-537-10329-8 | | |
| 30 | November 9, 2004 | 978-4-537-10349-6 | | |
| 31 | January 11, 2005 | 978-4-537-10368-7 | | |
| 32 | March 9, 2005 | 978-4-537-10383-0 | | |
| 33 | May 11, 2005 | 978-4-537-10400-4 | | |
| 34 | July 8, 2005 | 978-4-537-10416-5 | | |
| 35 | September 9, 2005 | 978-4-537-10433-2 | | |
| 36 | November 9, 2005 | 978-4-537-10450-9 | | |
| 37 | January 10, 2006 | 978-4-537-10469-1 | | |
| 38 | March 9, 2006 | 978-4-537-10482-0 | | |
| 39 | May 11, 2006 | 978-4-537-10495-0 | | |
| 40 | July 6, 2006 | 978-4-537-10507-0 | | |
| 41 | September 8, 2006 | 978-4-537-10530-8 | | |
| 42 | November 9, 2006 | 978-4-537-10545-2 | | |
| 43 | January 12, 2007 | 978-4-537-10591-9 | | |
| 44 | March 9, 2007 | 978-4-537-10611-4 | | |
| 45 | May 10, 2007 | 978-4-537-10640-4 | | |
| 46 | July 9, 2007 | 978-4-537-10682-4 | | |
| 47 | September 7, 2007 | 978-4-537-10701-2 | | |
| 48 | November 9, 2007 | 978-4-537-10740-1 | | |
| 49 | January 11, 2008 | 978-4-537-10779-1 | | |
| 50 | March 10, 2008 | 978-4-537-10797-5 | | |
| 51 | May 10, 2008 | 978-4-537-10822-4 | | |
| 52 | July 10, 2008 | 978-4-537-10848-4 | | |
| 53 | September 8, 2008 | 978-4-537-10872-9 | | |
| 54 | November 7, 2008 | 978-4-537-10889-7 | | |
| 55 | December 8, 2008 | 978-4-537-10903-0 | | |
| 56 | January 19, 2009 | 978-4-537-10919-1 | | |
| 57 | March 9, 2009 | 978-4-537-10936-8 | | |
| 58 | May 9, 2009 | 978-4-537-10955-9 | | |
| 59 | July 9, 2009 | 978-4-537-10977-1 | | |
| 60 | September 18, 2009 | 978-4-537-12491-0 | | |

=== Ginga Densetsu Weed: Orion ===
| No. | Release date | ISBN |
|---|---|---|
| 01 | November 18, 2009 | 978-4-537-12523-8 |
Chapters 1-7
| 02 | January 18, 2010 | 978-4-537-12557-3 |
Chapters 8-15
| 03 | March 20, 2010 | 978-4-537-12572-6 |
Chapters 16-23
| 04 | May 20, 2010 | 978-4-537-12598-6 |
Chapters 24-31
| 05 | July 20, 2010 | 978-4-537-12619-8 |
Chapters 32-39
| 06 | September 18, 2010 | 978-4-537-12638-9 |
Chapters 40-47
| 07 | November 18, 2010 | 978-4-537-12668-6 |
Chapters 48-55
| 08 | January 19, 2011 | 978-4-537-12708-9 |
Chapters 56-63
| 09 | March 18, 2011 | 978-4-537-12724-9 |
Chapters 64-71
| 10 | May 18, 2011 | 978-4-537-12741-6 |
Chapters 72-79
| 11 | July 16, 2011 | 978-4-537-12763-8 |
Chapters 80-87
| 12 | September 17, 2011 | 978-4-537-12784-3 |
Chapters 88-95
| 13 | October 19, 2011 | 978-4-537-12796-6 |
Chapters 96-103
| 14 | November 18, 2011 | 978-4-537-12807-9 |
Chapters 104-111
| 15 | January 18, 2012 | 978-4-537-12856-7 |
Chapters 112-119
| 16 | March 17, 2012 | 978-4-537-12865-9 |
Chapters 120-127
| 17 | May 18, 2012 | 978-4-537-12885-7 |
Chapters 128-135
| 18 | July 19, 2012 | 978-4-537-12910-6 |
Chapters 136-143
| 19 | September 7, 2012 | 978-4-537-12930-4 |
Chapters 144-151
| 20 | November 7, 2012 | 978-4-537-12951-9 |
Chapters 152-159
| 21 | January 9, 2013 | 978-4-537-12992-2 |
Chapters 160-167
| 22 | March 9, 2013 | 978-4-537-13005-8 |
Chapters 168-175
| 23 | May 9, 2013 | 978-4-537-13029-4 |
Chapters 176-183
| 24 | July 9, 2013 | 978-4-537-13055-3 |
Chapters 184-191
| 25 | September 9, 2013 | 978-4-537-13070-6 |
Chapters 192-199
| 26 | November 9, 2013 | 978-4-537-13092-8 |
Chapters 200-207
| 27 | January 9, 2014 | 978-4-537-13120-8 |
Chapters 208-215
| 28 | March 19, 2014 | 978-4-537-13141-3 |
216-223: Chapters
| 29 | May 19, 2014 | 978-4-537-13164-2 |
Chapters 224-231
| 30 | July 9, 2014 | 978-4-537-13185-7 |
Chapters 232-239

=== Ginga: The Last Wars ===
| No. | Release date | ISBN |
|---|---|---|
| 01 | September 9, 2015 | 978-4-537-13333-2 |
Chapters 1-8
| 02 | November 9, 2015 | 978-4-537-13359-2 |
Chapters 9-16
| 03 | January 9, 2016 | 978-4-537-13391-2 |
Chapters 17-24
| 04 | March 9, 2016 | 978-4-537-13414-8 |
Chapters 25-32
| 05 | May 9, 2016 | 978-4-537-13439-1 |
Chapters 33-40
| 06 | July 9, 2016 | 978-4-537-13461-2 |
Chapters 41-48
| 07 | September 9, 2016 | 978-4-537-13481-0 |
Chapters 49-56
| 08 | November 9, 2016 | 978-4-537-13506-0 |
Chapters 57-64
| 09 | February 9, 2017 | 978-4-537-13544-2 |
Chapters 65-72
| 10 | April 8, 2017 | 978-4-537-13568-8 |
Chapters 73-80
| 11 | June 8, 2017 | 978-4-537-13590-9 |
Chapters 81-88
| 12 | August 9, 2017 | 978-4-537-13611-1 |
Chapters 89-96
| 13 | October 7, 2017 | 978-4-537-13635-7 |
Chapters 97-104
| 14 | December 9, 2017 | 978-4-537-13663-0 |
Chapters 105-112
| 15 | February 9, 2018 | 978-4-537-13691-3 |
Chapters 113-120
| 16 | April 9, 2018 | 978-4-537-13725-5 |
Chapters 121-128
| 17 | June 9, 2018 | 978-4-537-13755-2 |
Chapters 129-136
| 18 | August 9, 2018 | 978-4-537-13789-7 |
Chapters 137-144
| 19 | October 9, 2018 | 978-4-537-13819-1 |
Chapters 145-152
| 20 | December 7, 2018 | 978-4-537-13853-5 |
Chapters 153-160
| 21 | February 9, 2019 | 978-4-537-13877-1 |
Chapters 161-168
| 22 | March 29, 2019 | 978-4-537-13898-6 |
Chapters 169-176

=== Ginga Densetsu Noah ===
| No. | Release date | ISBN |
|---|---|---|
| 01 | August 29, 2019 | 978-4-537-13964-8 |
Chapters 1–8
| 02 | October 28, 2019 | 978-4-537-13996-9 |
Chapters 9-16
| 03 | December 19, 2019 | 978-4-537-14180-1 |
Chapters 17-24
| 04 | February 28, 2020 | 978-4-537-14207-5 |
Chapters 25-32
| 05 | April 27, 2020 | 978-4-537-14237-2 |
Chapters 33-40
| 06 | July 29, 2020 | 978-4-537-14267-9 |
Chapters 41-48
| 07 | September 28, 2020 | 978-4-537-14284-6 |
Chapters 49-56
| 08 | December 19, 2020 | 978-4-537-14321-8 |
Chapters 57-64
| 09 | February 27, 2021 | 978-4-537-14345-4 |
Chapters 65-72
| 10 | May 19, 2021 | 978-4-537-14372-0 |
Chapters 73-80
| 11 | July 29, 2021 | 978-4-537-14394-2 |
Chapters 81-88
| 12 | October 7, 2021 | 978-4-537-14416-1 |
Chapters 89-96
| 13 | December 9, 2021 | 978-4-537-14437-6 |
Chapters 97-104
| 14 | February 9, 2022 | 978-4-537-14461-1 |
Chapters 105-112
| 15 | May 27, 2022 | 978-4-537-14508-3 |
| 16 | July 19, 2022 | 978-4-537-14528-1 |
| 17 | September 29, 2022 | 978-4-537-14551-9 |

== Ginga Densetsu: Requiem ==
| No. | Release date | ISBN |
|---|---|---|
| 01 | May 9, 2024 | 978-4-537-14816-9 |
Chapters 1-8
| 02 | August 7, 2024 | 978-4-537-14863-3 |
Chapters 9-16
| 03 | November 9, 2024 | 978-4-537-14917-3 |
Chapters 17-26
| 04 | February 7, 2025 | 978-4-537-14957-9 |
Chapters 25-32
