= Weed (manga) =

Japanese manga series by Yoshihiro Takahashi

- First tankōbon volume cover, featuring Weed (front)

銀牙伝説WEED(ウィード) (Ginga Densetsu Wīdo)
- Manga
- Written by: Yoshihiro Takahashi
- Published by: Nihon Bungeisha
- English publisher: NA: ComicsOne; (former)
- Magazine: Weekly Manga Goraku
- Original run: May 1, 1999 – July 3, 2009
- Volumes: 60
- Anime television series

Ginga Densetsu Weed
- Directed by: Toshiyuki Kato
- Studio: Studio Deen
- Original network: Animax
- Original run: November 3, 2005 – May 11, 2006
- Episodes: 26
- Manga

Ginga Densetsu Riki
- Written by: Yoshihiro Takahashi
- Published by: Nihon Bungeisha
- Magazine: Weed World
- Original run: March 31, 2002 – December 10, 2002
- Volumes: 1
- Manga

Ginga Densetsu Weed: Orion
- Written by: Yoshihiro Takahashi
- Published by: Nihon Bungeisha
- Magazine: Weekly Manga Goraku
- Original run: July 24, 2009 – April 25, 2014
- Volumes: 30
- Manga

Ginga: The Last Wars
- Written by: Yoshihiro Takahashi
- Published by: Nihon Bungeisha
- Magazine: Weekly Manga Goraku
- Original run: May 29, 2015 – March 29, 2019
- Volumes: 22
- Manga

Ginga Densetsu Noah
- Written by: Yoshihiro Takahashi
- Published by: Nihon Bungeisha
- Magazine: Weekly Manga Goraku
- Original run: May 24, 2019 – September 29, 2022
- Volumes: 17
- Manga

Ginga Densetsu: Requiem
- Written by: Yoshihiro Takahashi
- Published by: Nihon Bungeisha
- Magazine: Weekly Manga Goraku
- Original run: January 19, 2024 – present
- Volumes: 11
- Related works
- Silver Fang

Weed, known in Japan as Ginga Densetsu Weed (Japanese: 銀牙伝説WEED(ウィード), Hepburn: Ginga Densetsu Wīdo; lit. Silver Fang Legend Weed) is a Japanese manga series written and illustrated by Yoshihiro Takahashi. It is a sequel to Takahashi's 1980s manga Silver Fang, and focuses on Weed, a dog, the son of Gin, the original series' protagonist. Weed, named after the English word for wild plant, leaves his birthplace to search for his father in the Ōu Mountains. Upon arriving, Weed immediately begins protecting Ōu and its soldiers from dangerous threats. As the series progresses, Weed and his allies journey throughout Japan, aiding those in need and preventing takeovers.

Weed was originally serialized in the magazine Weekly Manga Goraku from May 1999 to July 2009. Publisher Nihon Bungeisha released 60 bound volumes and later reprinted early volumes. ComicsOne licensed the series for release in Canada and the United States by the name of Weed, but issued only three volumes before it went out of business.

In addition to the main series, Takahashi authored several side stories and books relating to Weed and the supporting cast. In 2005, NAS and SKY Perfect Well Think produced an anime series that aired on Animax. The show was released on several DVDs between 2006 and 2007 in Japan, and was licensed and distributed in Taiwan and several Nordic countries.

As of 2013, Weed had over 20 million copies in circulation, making it one of the best-selling manga series of all time.

== Plot ==
Several years after the events of Silver Fang, Gin's son is born in the Japanese Alps. After the puppy's mother Sakura dies from an illness, an English Setter named GB pledges to bring him to the Ōu Mountains and reunite him with his father. GB decides to name the pup Weed, after the English word for wild plant, because he is "small but powerful". Upon arriving at Ōu, the pair learn that a monstrous creature is wreaking havoc and Ōu has fallen into turmoil. Gin is away, on a desperate search for his mate. Weed, GB, and other Ōu soldiers meet a team of dogs led by the German Shepherd Jerome. Jerome explains that the monster is a mutated dog that escaped from a laboratory after killing several scientists. Weed's group joins them and they succeed in killing the monster, though lose several soldiers in the process, among them Gin's old ally, Smith.

Weed and principal cast members. From top to bottom: GB, Mel, Jerome, Kyōshirō, Kagetora, Ken, Tesshin, and Rocket

The series then introduces Hōgen and Genba, Great Dane brothers who plan to create an army and overthrow Gin. When Gin and his close friends John and Akame are found by Hōgen and his troops, Akame escapes to alert Ōu, while Gin, John, and Hiro (a dog loyal to Gin) are taken as hostages. John escapes, but is killed while acting as a diversion for Hiro. Akame locates Weed and explains the situation, prompting him to search for dogs to join Ōu's army. Gin escapes and starts recruiting soldiers. Hōgen, alone after having to mercy kill Genba, launches his attack on Ōu. Weed clashes with Hōgen and is injured, but spirits of dead Ōu soldiers appear to give him strength. Weed defeats Hōgen but chooses not to kill him. Hōgen stumbles away and is found by Shōji Sudou, a policeman whose partner was killed by Genba and Hōgen. Shōji shoots and kills Hōgen.

Later, Weed encounters a dog named Yukimura, and learns that a group of monkeys have been terrorizing the area. Leading them is Shōgun, a vicious baboon that feeds on young monkeys and puppies. Shōgun had previously attacked Yukimura and his family, permanently damaging his adopted father Saheiji. Weed, his comrades, Yukimura, and several rebellious monkeys attack Shōgun and his followers. Yukimura is able to injure Shōgun enough to ensure his death, but dies in the process. Saheiji reveals that Yukimura was Weed's brother: Sakura, too sick to care for all of her children, had given two of her puppies to Saheiji to raise as foster sons.

While Jerome is in Hokkaidō, he is captured by a Russian German shepherd named Victor, who aims to conquer the island. Jerome escapes and alerts Hakurō, a former Ōu soldier who resides in Hokkaidō. Hakurō and several of his sons are attacked and killed by Victor's forces. Gin and Weed go to Hokkaidō, but are unable to defeat Victor's troops. Jerome rejoins the Ōu soldiers with Lydia and Maxim, two subordinates of Victor. Angry at Maxim's betrayal, Victor orders a friend of Maxim, Alam, to kill him. Alam feels an intense regret for following orders, but later learns that Maxim survived. Alam decides to drown Victor by dragging him underwater and entangling him in seaweed. With Victor gone, Lydia chooses to stay with Jerome while Maxim and his remaining subordinates swim back to Russia.

While traveling, Weed meets his other brother, Joe. First Joe dislikes Gin for leaving Sakura unattended in the Alps. He is unaware that Sakura had left Ōu under the false impression that Gin was dead, and that Gin had been unaware of Sakura's leaving. Joe explains that a large hybrid bear has attacked and killed his mate, Hitomi. Weed's group joins Joe to defeat the animal. During the battle, GB dies saving Weed, and Weed vows to avenge him. Weed knocks himself and the bear into a river. The bear dies after hitting a floodgate and Weed manages to survive. He returns to Ōu and learns that his mate, Koyuki, is pregnant. Weeks later, she gives birth to four pups.

== Media ==
=== Manga ===
Weed was written and illustrated by Yoshihiro Takahashi. It is a sequel to his 1980s series Silver Fang, and follows the son of Gin, the title character from the original series. It began serialization in Weekly Manga Goraku magazine in 1999. The Japanese publisher Nihon Bungeisha released the series in collected volumes from January 2000 to September 2009. Cumulatively, 60 volumes were published. In October 2006, Nihon Bungeisha released the first volume of a reprinted edition of Weed. The company has released 22 volumes of the reprint edition, with the latest published in December 2007. The American company ComicsOne licensed the series for release in the United States and Canada in 2000 with the first three volumes released between March and June 2001. Additionally, they provided an Adobe Digital Editions e-book version. ComicsOne later went bankrupt. American publisher DrMaster acquired the rights to some of ComicsOne's titles, but not Ginga Densetsu Weed. While the physical copies are out-of-print, the e-book version is still available.

The original cover of Weed Gaiden. It was later reprinted (2007) and included in an omnibus with Ginga Densetsu Riki (2005)

Under their G-Comics imprint, Nihon Bungeisha released several Weed omnibus editions labeled as "specials". A series of three specials were released in April 2004 called Gajō no Kettō Hen (牙城の血闘編). Throughout 2009 and 2010, another set of eight "specials" were produced: Tabidachi Hen (September 2009), Senshi no Shōmei Hen (October 2009), Inuzoku no Tsutome Hen (November 2009), Otoko no Yakusoku Hen (December 2009), Taiman Shōbu Hen (January 2010), Taishō no Utsuwa Hen (February 2010), Dōshu Taiketsu Hen (March 2010), and Uketsuga Reshi Kiba Hen (April 2010).

=== Related books ===
Nihon Bungeisha released several books authored by Takahashi that relate to the main series. Ginga Densetsu Weed Gaiden (銀牙伝説ウィード外伝), first released on August 9, 2001 and re-released in December 2007, is a collection of four short stories, including a side-story about a Golden Retriever named Mel, who is a character in the main series, and the story of Takahashi's former dog Hanako. My Dog, My Weed (ぼくの犬 僕のウィード), a collection of art, essays, and personal experiences pertaining to the attachment between people and animals, was released in November 2001. In 2002, Nihon Bungeisha released a magazine called Weed World(ウィードWORLD), which centered around Weed and related material. In total, 5 issues were published between March and May. In January 2002, an art book entitled Ginga Densetsu Weed: Gengashū (銀牙伝説ウィード原画集) was released. Ginga Densetsu Weed: Meishōbu Retsuden (銀牙伝説ウィード名勝負列伝), a book containing character biographies and statistics, was released in May 2003. In November 2005, Ginga Densetsu Weed Tokubetsu Han (銀牙伝説ウィード特別版), an omnibus volume containing the prequel Ginga Densetsu Riki and Weed Gaiden, was released.

=== Anime ===
In 2005, NAS and SKY Perfect Well Think produced a 26-episode animated adaptation of Weed, directed by Toshiyuki Kato and animated by Studio Deen. The anime focused only on the Monster Arc and Hogen Arc, respectively and made some particular changes from the manga, like taking the life of a main character who survived in the manga, making characters who die in the manga live and making Weed the only son of Gin. In Japan, the series aired from November 3, 2005 to May 11, 2006 on Animax with the SKY PerfecTV! service. Dohatsuten, a Japanese band, performed both the opening and ending themes, Ginga Densetsu Weed and Tsuki Akari (つきあかり), respectively. On December 7, 2005, Imperial Records released a single containing the themes and karaoke versions. The full soundtrack for the series, composed by Y2 DOGS, was released by Imperial Records on January 25, 2006. The entirety of Weed was initially released on 13 DVDs published between February 17, 2006 and March 1, 2007. On August 29, 2008, a complete box set containing all 13 discs was released. The electronics company Sankyo created a Weed pachinko game that utilizes the anime character designs.

Top-Insight International licensed Weed for release in Taiwan. The company released seven individual DVDs, and one complete box set. The series aired in Taiwan on China Television. Future Film licensed and released the series in Finland. The company released Ginga Densetsu Weed on eight separate DVDs between August 2, 2006 and December 5, 2006. On November 14, 2007, Future Film released the entire series on a collector's edition. The release was bundled with a Weed booklet and mobile phone charm. In Sweden, AudVid distributed the series in one box set on June 15, 2007. The set included an extra 16-page booklet. The Finnish and Swedish releases included both Swedish and Finnish subtitles. In Denmark, Scanbox Entertainment released eight DVDs containing the series in 2007, and in 2008 produced two box sets containing episodes 1-13 and 14–26, respectively. In addition to a Danish dub, Scanbox's release included Danish and Norwegian subtitles.

No.	Title	Original release date
1	"His Name Is Weed!"; Transliteration: "Sono na wa Weed!" (Japanese: その名はウィード!)	November 3, 2005
14 years after the battle at Gajō, in which Gin the Akita Inu defeated Akakabuto the demon bear, Gajō is attacked by a hellish monster and Gin's friend, Smith the French Spaniel, escapes with Gin's mate, Sakura the kishu, into the Northern Alps, where Sakura gives birth to a puppy. 6 months later, GB the English Setter, stumbles upon the pup during his hunting. He is informed that Sakura is sick and needs nutrition and in kindness, gives his prey to the pup. His boss, Nero the Siberian Husky gets angry with him for returning empty-handed and orders him and another dog, Sasuke the Shiba Inu, to go and bring ducks from a nearby farm. Sasuke is nearly killed by the guard dog of the farm as GB catches a duck and heartlessly escapes. However, the pup comes to save Sasuke and GB, inspired by him, fights the guard dog too and saves Sasuke. They come across Smith, who had lost one of his legs, in order to save GB from a vehicle accident and had been taken away from Sakura. Smith recognizes the pup as Sakura's son and goes to Sakura with the pup, GB and Sasuke. Sakura succumbs to her sickness and before dying, requests Smith to take her son to Gajō. After giving Sakura a burial, GB christens the pup Weed and sets out with Weed and Smith towards Gajō in Ōu, while Sasuke goes to find his human owner.
2	"The Tool Of The General"; Transliteration: "Taishō no utsuwa" (Japanese: 大将の器)	November 10, 2005
On their way to Ōu, the trio stumbles across a puppy who is being chased by a human for stealing his goods. Weed and the other save the puppy, but he rushes away without saying anything to them. A nearby pet dog, Hook the Labrador Retriever, informs them that the puppy is Mel the Golden Retriever and that he is the slave of Blue the beauceron, who lives in the nearby mountains. Hook and his brother were originally Blue's slaves and when his brother revolted against him, Blue killed Hook's brother. Weed and GB rush to save Mel, while Smith encourages Hook to come with them. Weed and GB encounter blue and when GB says that they are Ōu soldiers, Blue laughs and says that he is a liar and that the Ōu paradise was destroyed a while ago, which they don't believe. The duo fights Blue and Weed encourages Mel to become stronger and break free of Blue's tyranny, to which Mel attacks Blue. Meanwhile, Hook breaks free of his chain and rushes with Smith to the mountains, vengeful. They defeat Blue's minions while Blue escapes and says that he has a connection to Nero. As Blue is crossing the road, he is hit by a truck. Weed rushes to help him and Blue pushes him away as another truck drives over him. Weed asks Blue why he saved him, to which Blue replies that Weed was the only one who ever showed kindness to him in his life and that he wishes that he could've met someone like Weed earlier, before dying. Smith, GB and Weed continues their journey to Ōu, joined by Mel, while Hook stays behind.
3	"The Truth Of Futago Pass"; Transliteration: "Futago tōge no shinjitsu" (Japanese: 二子峠の真実)	November 17, 2005
During their journey, GB, Smith and Mel gets tired and slows down. While they are resting, GB tells Weed to freely go to Ōu all by himself, telling him that the rest of the group can catch up later to which Weed agrees and goes on. Smith wakes up and scolds GB for his reckless suggestion and sends him to protect Weed. After a long journey, Weed reaches Futago Pass, the place in which there is Ōu. However, instead of a Dog Paradise, he finds hundreds of dog corpses and meets, Ken the Great Dane and Kagetora the Kai Ken, both of whom are sons of old Ōu soldiers. They first snap at him to get out of Ōu, but after seeing his speed and strength, Kagetora informs him that Ōu was attacked by a demonic animal called Kaibutsu and he killed dogs. The leader, Gin, told them with some other guard dogs to keep Kaibutsu locked inside Ōu, but the monster broke through them and began attacking and eating humans. The humans nearby thought that the dogs were the man-eaters and began shooting them to stop the killings, killing several innocent dogs. Ken and Kagetora, along with other uard dogs, pleaded with the leader to let them die fighting with Kaibutsu, as they didn't want to die by being shot, but the leader said that it was not the time and went away. GB arrives and informs them that Weed is the leader's son, which they refuse to believe. The humans again shoot and kill several dogs. Weed encounters his father, although Gin snaps at him that he doesn't have a son. Kaibutsu attacks and Weed is petrified by the beast's mutated appearance, so Gin pushes Weed away and gets captured by Kaibutsu, who kills him. Ken, Kagetora and other dogs attack but are unable to even pierce Kaibutsu's skin. Weed finally slashes Kaibutsu's cheek in anger, surprising Ken and Kagetora as Weed is the first one to break Kaibutsu's skin. The humans shoot again, causing Kaibutsu to run away. Ken, Kagetora, Weed and GB meet up with Smith and Mel, who had reached Ōu. Smith identifies the dog they thought as Gin to be Gin's substitute, Tokimune and says that after the battle with Akakabuto, Gin and his close friends John and Akame, went to different places to solve different problems and they all had substitutes to fill in for them when they were gone. Ken and Kagetora, being guard dogs were unaware of this fact. Weed, Ken and Kagetora mourns for Tokimune and after his burial, they notice a strange group of shadowy dogs watching them.
4	"Succeeding Soul"; Transliteration: "Uketsugareshi tamashii" (Japanese: 受け継がれし魂)	November 24, 2005
The shadowy group of dogs introduce themselves as domesticated dogs whose duty is to kill Kaibutsu. The leader of the group informs them that Kaibutsu is not a monster but a genetically experimented dog created by the humans. The group of dogs were originally guard dogs of a research center where Kaibutsu was being experimented on. Many years of experimentation by the humans are responsible for Kaibutsu's mutated appearance. Kaibutsu apparently broke free from the laboratory, killed many humans and escaped into the mountains. When the Ōu army insists that they help the guard dogs to fight Kaibutsu, as Kaibutsu had killed many of their soldiers too, the group of dogs take no notice and runs forward. The group of dogs jump from a cliff up ahead and reaches the cliff on the other side, where there is Gajō. The Ōu army is a little scared to follow them, but Smith tells them that most of the Ōu soldiers had jumped the cliff and the one who reaches the other side is considered a true soldier. Weed and the others jump form the cliff, even Mel and Smith and manage to reach the other side and the group of dogs finally become ally with them. The leader of the group is Jerome the German Shepherd and with him are his four comrades: Robert the American Foxhound, Rocker the Doberman Pinscher, North the Hokkaido dog and Heuler the Gascon saintongeois. Jerome wants Weed to lure Kaibutsu out of Gajō, so that they can all attack him together. He says that Kaibutsu has exposed arteries on his chest that, if torn, can kill him. Weed agrees and North is sent to navigate for him. As they go deeper inside Gajō, Kaibutsu makes a sudden attack, killing North and throwing his corpse out of Gajō. Weed tries to tear Kaibutsu's arteries, but only tears his skin. Smith goes inside Gajō to help Weed, inspired by how Jerome and his squad are ready to give away their lives for their mission. Smith pushes aside Weed and bites onto Kaibutsu's neck, as Kaibutsu continuously smashes himself and Smith against the rocks to rid himself of Smith. Due to the constant smashing on them, hundreds of rocks finally crashes down on Kaibutsu and Smith, crushing Smith to death. His corpse is dragged outside Gajō, as Weed, Mel and GB mourns at his death. Inside Gajō, Kaibutsu is shown to be alive even after getting crushed by rocks as he questions why the dogs are taking the human's side.
5	"Released Decision"; Transliteration: "Hanareta ketsui" (Japanese: 放たれた決意)	December 1, 2005
A human helicopter comes towards Gajō, containing one of the human scientists who was attacked by Kaibutsu. Kaibutsu jumps out of Gajō and roars, scaring away three of the dogs. He questions why they are supporting the humans and trying to kill him, especially to Jerome. Jerome replies that humans are dogs' best partners and that Kaibutsu, originally being a dog, has killed and eater humans, which is something Jerome considers unacceptable. Kaibutsu says that humans had originally betrayed him by torturing him through genetic experiments and mutated his appearance. He reminds Jerome of how he would soothe and comfort Kaibutsu during his days as a genetic experiment and how he would give him strength to live and bear the pain. He insists that he had lost all positive feelings towards everything and has truly become a man-eating beast, laughing maniacally. In anger, GB, Ken Kagetora, Weed and Mel attack him and he manages to push them away. Jerome's group runs towards the other side of Gajō to lure him, Jerome calling him by his laboratory name, P4 to anger him. Robert, Rocker and Heuler attack Kaibutsu on Jerome's order and make a deep wound on his chest, but in turn, all three of them get killed. As Jerome attacks, Weed and the others hold Kaibutsu to make sure he is distracted, giving Jerome enough time to dig deep into his chest and bite his arteries. As they try to rescue Jerome Kaibutsu grabs Kagetora and tries killing him but Jerome nips his arteries again, causing him to let go. Kaibutsu manages to pull Jerome off him, but Jerome quickly catches his jaw and pulls him down in the gorge between the cliffs. However, Kaibutsu is still alive and bites onto Jerome's ribs. He manages to climb up to the edge of the cliff, holding Jerome in his mouth. Kagetora sees that Jerome is still alive and says that his uncle, Akatora died just like Jerome's squad, to injure the enemy so that others could kill him. Kaibutsu throws Jerome down the gorge when he sees that the dogs are still wanting to fight, causing Ken, Kagetora and Weed to push him of the cliff in rage. They start falling down, when Weed notices that if they land the way they are falling, they all will die.
6	"Imminent Ambition"; Transliteration: "Semari kuru yabō" (Japanese: 迫りくる野望)	December 8, 2005
As they are falling, Weed uses the wind currents around them turn Kaibutsu's body, with his back facing the gorge. Ken and Kagetora let go of Kaibutsu and all four of them fall down below. GB and Mel rush dowin to help them, as Ken drags Kagetora out of the river in the gorge, and they see that Kaibutsu has gotten impaled on the chest by the spike of a log above the river and is dead. However, Weed and Jerome are nowhere to be found and the four of them try finding them, suspecting that they had fallen down the waterfall at the end of the gorge. Some distances away, Weed holds Jerome tightly, as Jerome tells Weed to let him go and that his usefulness has finished, but Weed refuses. Soon, they are rescued but the human helicopter from before comes down towards them, probably to collect Jerome, as he is the only survivor in his group. Jerome violently refuses to go back with the humans and says that he is one of the Ōu soldiers now, barking severely at them, to which the helicopter leaves. Peace is restored in paradise for a while. Meanwhile, one week later, Hook ventures into the Northern Alps and gets attacked by Nero and his gang. However, he is rescued by Gin and his close friends Akame the kishu and John the German Shepherd. Hook informs them about Sakura's death and the birth of Weed, to which the trio thanks him and moves on. Somewhere in the Japanese Alps, Nero is speaking to someone in a little hut, surrounded by many other dogs, telling him of the trio. The dog in the hut tells him to come inside the hut so he can hear him, to which Nero complies and instantly get killed. The dog inside the hut, a harlequin Great Dane comes out, saying that losing to the Ōu soldiers means it is too embarrassing to live. He then orders a borzoi trio to go and find the Gin and his subordinates. Meanwhile, in a snowstorm, an Akita Inu called Reika spots Gin and his friends and says that her father was one of the soldiers who fought against Akakabuto. She takes them an empty cabin to rest and is bringing food for them when she stumbles upon the leader of the borzoi trio, Rocket. He say says that he works for someone called Hōgen asks about Gin and she lies that she hadn't seen them. However, as she makes her way to the cabin, Rocket and his brothers spy on her and get to know where Gin is. Reika informs them about Rocket's saying, to which Akame says that he had heard that Hōgen is troublesome. Reika goes out and Akame hears a noise, to which he goes outside and finds an entire army of dogs waiting for them. The Great Dane from before comes towards the cabin and both John and Gin also come out. They introduce themselves and the Great Dane treats them in a rude manner and says that he is Hōgen. He orders his entire army to attack the trio and Gin orders Akame to escape and go to Ōu to inform Weed about this. Right after Akame leaves, Gin and John see that Hōgen has taken Reika as hostage and threatens to kill her if they oppose him. Hōgen orders his army to beat John and Gin to death. Meanwhile, at Gajō, Weed and the rest of the Ōu soldiers bury the ones who have died due to Kaibutsu.
7	"A New Rumbling"; Transliteration: "Aratanaru meidō" (Japanese: 新たなる鳴動)	December 15, 2005
Gin and John are beaten by Hōgen's soldiers and are dragged off to a spot in the Alps, along with Reika, who Hōgen treats in a perverted manner, as he announces the birth of his reign and Hook watches form afar. At Gajō, Weed waits for his father while Jerome says that he should fill in for the leader while he is gone and that he (Jerome) will be his helper. GB informs them that Akame has come back to Ōu and Akame informs Weed that his father is in danger. Weed, Jerome, GB, Ken and Kagetora go with some other soldiers, while few other soldiers, Mel and Akame stay behind to protect Gajō. The borzoi trio spies on them and the leader, Rocket, decides to join the pack in order to know them better and orders his brothers, Jet and Missile to spy on the pack while he is gone. He joins the Ōu army as a spy and introduces himself as someone who fought for Gin. At one night, while everyone's resting, Weed requests Jerome to teach him the basics of fighting. Meanwhile, Rocket scares away a big part of the army by saying that Hōgen has ten times stronger forces than them and when questioned about it, he blames on one of the older dogs of the group who escaped. Rocket is informed that Weed is their leader by GB. During their journey, Weed begins going through training from Jerome on fighting. One day, everyone goes to find food, leaving Rocket alone with Weed. Weed gets attacked by a reckless follower of Hōgen, whom Rocket defeats in order to gain the Ōu army's trust. Weed orders Rocket not to kill him, surprising him with his kindness. Meanwhile, one of Rocket's brothers informs Hōgen that the Ōu army is small. John and Gin are kept in a small shed, badly injured, when Hōgen torments them brutally. At a spot in the Alps, two guards of Hōgen meet an arrogant dog, who wishes to go into Hōgen's territory. When the guards try to stop him, he brutally castrates one of them. He introduces himself as Hiro the Great Pyrenees, who usually injures his enemies by ripping off their testicles. The other guard flees in fear. As the Ōu army continues their journey, Rocket tells Weed that he isn't happy with how kind he is and snatches up Weed and runs away to his brothers. However, Jerome comes to protect Weed.
8	"Beyond The Bond"; Transliteration: "Kizuna no Mukō" (Japanese: 絆の向こう)	December 22, 2005
Jerome fights the borzoi trio and Rocket fails to persuade them to join Hōgen's side. He pins down Rocket as the rest of the Ōu army arrives. Weed tells him to let Rocket go. Weed gives him an ultimatum, that if they don't free his father, they will fight them fair and square. Rocket, moved by the Ōu army's determination, joins them, leaving behind his brothers. Meanwhile, in the Alps, Hook joins Hōgen's army in order to help John and Gin. He gives them minerals from snow. Hiro comes near Hōgen's shed, as Reika escapes Hōgen and hides behind Hiro. Hiro fights Hōgen's minions but Hōgen takes Reika hostage again, forcing Hiro to surrender and be taken to the shed where Gin and John are kept. Weed and the Ōu army continue their journey, ignoring Rocket. When they wonder how to get more comrades to fight Hōgen, Rocket says that they have to cross the Alps, where there are some dogs who don't obey Hōgen. While most of the army doesn't trust him, Weed insists that he is telling the truth. Jerome leads the way to the Alps, while Ken and Kagetora are sent to Kofu to bring back their family members, who were Ōu fighters. Meanwhile, Jet and Missile are cornered by Hōgen's minions and Hōgen informs them that they had been spied on. His minions beat them to death while Hook and some other dogs try helping Gin, John and Hiro, who refuses at first, but when he hears that they'll rescue Reika too, agrees. Gin is unable to even stand and says that they should leave him behind, giving the mission of rescuing Reika more importance. In the high mountains of the alps, the Ōu army struggle against a snowstorm as GB suggests that Rocket has tricked them again, only to fall a second later. Weed rushes in to save him and while they are hanging from a branch, Rocket pulls them upward unexpectedly. Rocket is about to fall but is saved by Jerome. The Ōu army finally trusts Rocket completely and he becomes one of their members. In the Alps, Hōgen's minions set out to find the escaped hostages and Hook gives them false directions. Hōgen furiously orders his minions to find and kill John, Hiro, Reika and some other dogs that went with them.
9	"A Broken Oath"; Transliteration: "Kudake enu chikai" (Japanese: 砕けえぬ誓い)	December 29, 2005
The Ōu army decides to rest in the Alps, as Rocket tells them about the leader of the group of dogs that don't obey Hōgen, called Kyōshirō, who is one year old but still heartless. As they escape, John orders Hiro to leave with Reika, while he'll stop Hōgen's minions. Hiro complies after some arguing but makes John promise that he won't die. The other dogs, Lefty, Tommy and Rossi decide to stay and fight with John. Hōgen's minions soon catch up with them and they fight viciously, killing many minions. However, Lefty is quickly killed and John, Tommy and Rossi are pinned down and the latter two are also killed as Hōgen arrives. Hōgen sits on top of Tommy's corpse to insult him and says that he will sit on John when Tommy's corpse gets cold. John insults Hōgen to which Hōgen orders his minions to beat him to death. Meanwhile, Hiro and Reika reach Weed and his friends and they take the two to a shed where Hiro is forced to rest because of his wounds, although he wants to help John. Reika finds out that she had been lied to by John, as he said that Gin had escaped and was waiting for them, when he was actually still lying in the shed. Hiro informs Weed about his father and John and falls to the floor, tired and everyone tries healing his wounds while Weed goes to help John. Hook reaches the place John is in and witnesses John being brutally beaten by Hōgen and his minions. John orders that nobody should come to save him, frustrating Hook. Even after getting broken down physically, John threatens Hōgen, to which the Great Dane beats him again and screams at him to beg for mercy. However, John says he won't die the way Hōgen wants him to and Hōgen impales him upon a tree spike in anger. Back at the shed, GB notices Weed's absence and they set out to find him. At the battle scene, John breaks the spike form the tree, pulls it out of him and throws it at Hōgen's face and falls down, saying that he is full of spirit even though his body could work only for a few minutes. To this, Hōgen finally loses his temper and shakes John violently and crushes his vertebrae. He says that he has lost interest in Reika and goes back to his hut with his army. Hook, Weed and the rest of the Ōu army come near John to inspect his injuries. John meets Weed in his last moment and Hiro tells him that Hōgen has been captured to give him hope to live. However, John is too physically damaged to live and he dies quietly, breaking the promise he made to Hiro.
10	"The Justice Of Two"; Transliteration: "Futatsu no seigi" (Japanese: 二つの正義)	January 19, 2006
John, Tommy, Lefty and Rossi's corpses are carried back to the shed and a funeral is held for them after their burials. Hook decides to deliver one of John's fangs, which had fallen out during the skirmish, to Ōu. During the funeral, Rocket gets to know about his brothers' deaths from Hook and in grief, he starts howling, joined shortly after by Weed, GB, Hiro, Jerome and Hook. In the morning, Hook is given the duty to escort Reika to Ōu, as he is going to Ōu anyway to bury John's fang. The Ōu army continues their journey to meet Kyōshirō and his pack in Shiga. Meanwhile, at Kofu, Ken and Kagetora meet with their family members: Kurotora, Kagetora's father, Harutora and Nobutora, Kagetora's brothers, Shoji, Shigure, Buru and Dodo, Kagetora's cousins, Ben the Great Dane, Ken's father and Cross the saluki, Ken's mother. Kurotora, Ben and Cross are three of the earliest Ōu soldiers and after his brother Chutora's death, Kurotora raised Chutora's sons like his own. Nobutora and Harutora are sent with Ken and Kagetora to help the Ōu army, while Kurotora, Ben, Cross and Kagetora's cousins go to protect Gajō. Ben, although he has become old and near-sighted, is still cheerful and energetic and both he and his mate are happy about Ken's growth. On their way to meet Kyōshirō, Weed and the others hear a scream of a child and soon stumbles across an adult dog running away in fear from a scarred kishu. The kishu tears off one of the adult dog's ears and is about to kill him when Weed stops him. He speaks rudely to them and summons his huge pack of dogs. The kishu then introduces himself as Kyōshirō the silver. While they are talking, the adult dog tries escaping but is pinned down by Kyōshirō's minions. Kyōshirō informs Weed that his whole pack consists of dog children abused by their parents and rescued by Kyōshirō. He then asks a pup named Teru, the son of the adult dog, whether he considers the adult as his father or not and informs Weed that Teru's father had been violently abusing his son for doing something he didn't actually do. When Teru replies that he doesn't Teru's father is pushed from a cliff into a river and Kyōshirō warns him to stay away from Teru. After doing this, Kyōshirō warns Weed not to bother his comrades and leaves. Meanwhile, in the Alps, Hōgen is informed about the Ōu army crossing the Alps and going to Shiga and says that there is nothing to worry about, since he has sent professional killers to take care of them. Back at his shed, Teru's father is desperately trying to find any leftover food, when he is confronted by two shadowy dogs after he says he wishes to kill Kyōshirō and his pack. Weed goes out to search for Kyōshirō to talk things through with him and witnesses the kishu attacking Teru's father again, saying that he shall be killed for coming close to Teru. However, Weed interferes and throws down Kyōshirō and starts a fight with him. Jerome, Hiro, Rocket and GB notice two strange dogs watching form afar and when the two move away, two of Kyōshirō's minions, GB and Rocket go after them.
11	"Weed Awakens"; Transliteration: "Weed kakusei" (Japanese: ウィード覚醒)	January 26, 2006
Kyōshirō and Weed have a fight with passive-aggressive conversations when they notice how Teru is telling Kyōshirō to kill Weed. Kyōshirō orders Teru to be taken away and again fights, throwing rocks at Weed. However, he is tricked and gets his head buried in snow. However, they hear a scream and the fight is forgotten as they rush over to find, two of Kyōshirō's followers, GB and Rocket lying injured. Kyōshirō orders his group to split up and find the assailants, while Teru rests. He speaks to Weed about how Teru has no parents but still needs to be raised by someone, when the two groups of Kyōshirō's followers return, saying that the footprints of the Assailants led back to the same spot. However, Teru is abducted by the assailants, two Doberman Pinschers. Teru says that he doesn't care about his own life, although looking terrified and Kyōshirō tries tricking the assailants by exposing his chest and ordering his minions to go away. However, Weed interferes and introduces himself as the leader of Ōu, which surprises both Kyōshirō and the two assailants, who let Teru go. GB, Jerome, Hiro, Rocket and the rest of the Ōu army reach the scene and watches from afar, as Jerome identifies the two Dobermans as professional assassins, Lecter and Thunder or the Killer Fang Duo. They both were originally working dogs in the same area as Jerome but were transferred to another area place, where they were trained to become killers and got extremely sharp fangs. Lecter chases after Kyōshirō, while Thunder chases after Weed and both get slashed severely by the Doberman's fangs. However, Weed manages to slash Thunder twice. Kyōshirō tries tricking Lecter, but Teru's father, who is working for the assassin, reveals his plan to Lecter, to which Teru snaps at his father and says that he is no longer his child. In the fight, Weed picks up a long and smashes it onto Thunder's jaws, breaking his fangs. Teru's father, seeing that he odd were soon going to be on him, tries escaping but is cornered by Jerome, Rocket, GB and Hiro, who scold him for being such a coward and encourages him to stand up for his son. Lecter finally pins down Kyōshirō, while Thunder tries blocking Weed away from him. However, Teru interferes, causing Lecter to let Kyōshirō go and pin down the puppy. The Ōu army encourages Teru's father to fight for his child's sake and he finally gains some courage. Lecter orders Weed to kill Kyōshirō, threatening to kill Teru if he doesn't. However, Teru's father steps out and says that he'll kill Kyōshirō, as Kyōshirō had ripped off his ear. However, he quickly turns to Lecter and screams at him, before pushing the Doberman away from his son.
12	"An Honorable Promise"; Transliteration: "Kan no yakusoku" (Japanese: 漢の約束)	February 2, 2006
Teru's father fights for his son and tries stopping Lecter in order to give Teru enough time to escape and in turn gets his jaw crushed by Lecter. The Ōu army rushes out into the scene, to which Lecter says that they are Hōgen's subordinates and the assassins try to escape. Jerome catches Lecter and Hiro gives him a quick shaking, while GB stops Thunder. Weed decides to give the two brothers a second chance and orders them to get out of Kyōshirō's territory. As the two brothers leave, Teru's father begs to Teru to forgive him, although Teru is hesitant. Kyōshirō bluntly throws Teru towards his father and when he sees the injury caused to his father by Lecter just to try and protect him, he began to cry. His father gives him one last look before succumbing to his wounds and dying as Teru starts mourning in sorrow. Kyōshirō's pack shows up and Kyōshirō informs them about how Teru's father stood up for his son. Kyōshirō is deeply moved by Weed and his army's method of encouraging people by talking and forgiving their enemies and kindness and decides to join the Ōu army and defeat Hōgen. Meanwhile, at Gajō, a harlequin Great Dane defeats the three guards of Gajō, while Mel is chasing a bird to catch it. He is confronted by a group of brutish dogs looking for Gajō and he gives them a false direction. Mel quickly reaches Gajō and began's howling for Akame to come. However, Ben, Cross, Kurotora and his nephews hear the howling too and Kurotura and his nephews make their way towards Gajō while Ben and Cross rest a bit. During their rest, they meet Hook and Reika. However, Mel's howling also leads the group of brutish dogs to Gajō, who demand that Gajō be handed over to them. However, Mel remembers how brave Weed is and gets courage and attacks the dogs. Meanwhile, Akame, who is escaping from the harlequin Great Dane's group and has climbed up a tree, spies on the group of 200 dogs and the leader, whom he thinks is Hōgen. However, he quickly realizes from the conversations between the leader and his subordinates that it is actually Hōgen's younger brother, Genba. At Gajō, Mel fights the group of dogs violently. Akame hears Genba talking about how his older brother was planning on making his subordinates step on Gin's backbone to prove their loyalty, but Genba quickly senses Akame in the trees and orders his minions to surround it. However, Akame tricks the group by jumping from tree to tree and throwing snow down on the ground and escapes. Mel is pinned down by the brutish dogs, but Kurotora and his nephews arrive and the brutish dogs threaten them that they are Genba's minion and there are 200 behind them. However, Kurotora and his nephews kill the dogs swiftly, before preparing to fight Genba's army.
13	"Eternal Pride!"; Transliteration: "Eien no hokori!" (Japanese: 永遠の誇り!)	February 9, 2006
Weed and the others decide to increase their number a little bit more, when Ken and Kagetora meet up with them, along with Kagetora's younger brothers. Kagetora informs them that Hōgen has gathered over 500 soldiers and to increase the number in their own army, they should go to the village of the Kōga Ninja dogs, where there is an Ōu ninja dog soldier called Tesshin. The Ōu army sets out to the Kōga village. Meanwhile at Gajō, in a snowstorm, Kurotora's nephew watch to see if Genba's army has arrived. Kurotora boasts about how he'll defeat them quickly, but when he actually spots them, he is shocked by their number. Kurotora says that they are kai kens, meaning that they cannot turn their backs in a battle, as Mel watches in horror. Kurotora's nephews are too grateful to him to leave him, but Kuorora says that they'll fight and cut through Genba's army and whoever survives must get to Mutsu to gather some Ōu comrades form there. Kurotora and his nephews prepare to fight, but Akame shows up and shouts at them to stop, but Kurotora tells him there is no way he can escape now. As Genba's army comes closer, Kurotora begins insulting Genba, to which the Great Dane finally loses his temper and orders his minions to kill them. Kurotora prepares to fight, but Shouji, one of his nephews, pushes him down from the top of Gajō to Akame and says that he isn't going to let the uncle who raised them die and that Akame should escape with Kurotora and Mel and that they'll follow shortly after. Ignoring Kurota's angry screams, Akame grabs him and jumps down into the river in the gorge along with Mel. However, instead of jumping down with them, Shouji orders his brothers to attack Genba's army. Akame pushes Kurotora up onto the river bank, where Hook, Reika, Ben and Cross are waiting. Mel climbs up shortly after, but Kurotora angrily snaps that his nephew won't listen to someone else's opinions and Akame quickly realizes that Kurotora's nephews were actually lying and had begun fighting with Genba's army. Meanwhile, the Ōu army makes their way to the Kōga village and come across Tesshin. At Ōu, Kurotora's nephews cuts through Genba's army as Genba gets more and more furious. Dodo and Buru quickly get pinned and Shouji stays behind to distract the guards as Shigure escapes. However, he runs straight into Genba, who pins him down, but before he could kill him, Shouji bumps into him and orders Shigure to go to Mutsu. Shigure tearfully leaves as Shouji bites onto Genba's neck and Genba rips him off himself and smashes him down, killing him. After the battle, Genba comes over to see the corpses of Shouji, Buru and Dodo and comments on how they died laughing at his soldiers. When asked about the corpses, he says that they are trash and throws them down into the river below, before laughing in victory of taking over Gajō. In the morning, the corpses are found by Akame, Mel, Hook and Kurotora, who vows to get revenge for his nephews. Meanwhile, the Ōu army talks with Tesshin and he says that the elder of the Kōga village is ill and he has to take care of them and thus, he cannot come with them. However, after the Ōu army leaves, he has a talk with the Kōga elder and the Kōga elder encourages him to go and help Weed. Tesshin leaves with a pack of ninja-dogs to help Weed.
14	"The Assassin's Slithering Dagger"; Transliteration: "Ugomeku kyō katana" (Japanese: 蠢く凶刀」)	February 16, 2006
The Ōu army reaches Kishu, Rocket's hometown, where they decide to rest near a cliff after seeing that everyone's tired, but Rocket hears a strange rumbling sound and they witness a large group of dogs using a broken tree to ram into a human truck and steal the chickens inside the truck. It begins to rain as Rocket goes to check what's happening in the forest. He spies on the group of dogs eating the stolen chickens, but he is soon pinned down by a huge, grey dog. Meanwhile, Tesshin arrives in the Alps to rescue Gin. He gets through the guards and tries to rescue Gin, but Gin is too badly injured for him to carry and Gin tells him to pass on a message to Weed. Back at Kishu, the Ōu army gets suspicious after Rocket doesn't return by morning and as they search for him in the forest, they come across a dog, who says that he is a local and that he saw Rocket last night. However, the dog leads them into a trap by going near some humans and howling loudly and then escaping, leaving them to face the danger. The humans, mistaking them for the dogs who stole the chickens, began shooting at them and they manage to escape as Jerome distracts the humans by attacking them and later goes to spy on the humans. The grey dog that kidnapped Rocket watch from afar with his army, saying that if the humans couldn't kill them, he would. The Ōu army continue searching for Rocket, while Jerome arrives at the human headquarters and finds a truck full of dead dogs, all of whom were killed by other stray dogs and were found by the humans up in the mountains. He finds the dead group's boss dog's corpse and suspects a giant breed of dog had killed him. The Ōu army encounters the suspicious dog from before and chases him in anger. He leads them to the edge of a cliff, where they think they have cornered him, when he barks and a huge army of dogs come out and corner them. The suspicious dog goes back to his own group and is addressed as Stone by the leader of the group, who is an Irish Wolfhound and the same grey dog who kidnapped Rocket. Some distances away, the humans spot them and decide to go nearer and hunt them down as Jerome follows the humans. Weed introduces himself to the Irish Wolfhound and talks in a passive manner, only to have the Irish Wolfhound pin him down aggressively and introduce himself as Kamakiri and the invader of Kishu. All of a sudden, Hiro loses his temper and threatens to kill Kamakiri. Hiro recounts how Kamakiri and Stone were originally members of Hiro's father's pack. However, Kamakiri betrayed Hiro's father and killed him and made Hiro one-eyed, before Hiro escaped. Kamakiri says that he doesn't remember anything like this and Hiro angrily demands that Kamiri fight him, but Kamakiri shows them that he has taken Rocket hostage. Rocket informs them that Kamakiri and his army are actually Hōgen's followers and they had killed all the local dogs of Kishu. Jerome jumps out suddenly and knocks away Stone, rescuing Rocket. The German Shepherd tries stopping Kamakiri, but loses an ear in the process. Hiro attacks Kamakiri and they bite onto each other as Jerome informs everyone that the humans are coming to get them. Kamakiri's army doesn't believe him and Stone and some other dogs bite onto Hiro. Weed bites onto Kamakiri's snout, but Kamakiri throws him away. Weed attacks Kamakiri again and now makes a long cut on his neck. However, the humans come and began shooting and Kamakiri's army withdraws. As the humans continue shooting, Jerome pushes away Weed and gets hit on his leg by a bullet. He orders Ken and Kagetora to take away Weed and as the human try shooting him, he gathers up the strength he has left and jumps off the cliff edge.
15	"The Zetsu Tenrō Battōga!"; Transliteration: "Zetsu Tenrō Battōga" (Japanese: 絶 天狼抜刀牙!)	February 23, 2006
Having hauled himself up on some rocks in the river bank, Jerome comes across some dogs he suspects to be Kamakiri's followers. The Ōu army follows Jerome's blood trail, led by GB. At another part of the river, Kamakiri takes his anger out on a minion of his, slashing his neck underwater. He then prepares to go to the Alps with his army to meet up with Hōgen. The Ōu army is led to a misty area, where many shadowy dogs surround them and suddenly escape. GB, Ken, Kagetora and some other dogs chase after them against Weed's order and Weed chases to stop them and they all fall into a hot spring. The shadowy dogs are revealed to be Tesshin and his clan of ninja dogs. They also find Jerome in the hot spring, having been taken there by the ninja dogs. Tesshin relays Gin's massage to Weed and everyone gets in a rush to rescue the leader, but says that they cannot forcefully make wounded soldiers fight and should rest just for at least a little while. One night, weed is thinking about his mother, when Tesshin comes and tells him about the technique his father used to kill Akakabuto called the Zetsu Tenrō Battōga. The others arrive to see Weed executing the Battōga on a tree branch and GB recounts how Weed used the Battōga the first time he saved him to cut off the guard dog's ear. The Ōu army begins training under Tesshin on how to use different attack methods and Weed finally masters the Battōga. One night, when a part of Kyōshirō's army, Rocket and Jerome are resting in the hot spring, a trio of vicious, dog-eating wild boars attack them and the leader of the boars, Sancho, kills one of Kyōshirō's reckless minions. Kyōshirō, Weed and the others come and Kyōshirō angrily tries to attack the boar, but Jerome stops them as Sancho begins chasing them in the water. Weed executes his first learned Battōga on Sancho and cracks his skull, killing him. The other two boars flee in fear. Weed is dragged out of the water and is unconscious and Tesshin advises rest for him, as a Battōga takes up a lot of energy. Meanwhile, in the Alps, Kamakiri's army reaches Hōgen's hut and Kamakiri refuses to wait even though the guards tell him to and enters without permission inside Hōgen's hut. Hōgen, seeing Kamakiri's arrogance and disobedience, pins him down in an embarrassing manner, but in the end, decides to keep him as part of his army. With their armies combined and powerful, Hōgen and Kamakiri decide to set out towards Ōu. Due to the hot spring, Jerome's bullet wound heals, but when Tesshin tells him that if they don't take out the bullet from the wound, it'll become an infection, Jerome tells him that he wants to keep it as a punishment for sending his past comrades to death without thinking twice. With Tesshin and the ninja dogs, Weed departs from Kishu.
16	"Farewell"; Transliteration: "Ketsubetsu" (Japanese: 決別)	March 2, 2006
The Ōu army goes back to the Kōga village, where they plan on keeping the pups of Kyōshirō's army. The pups, led by Teru, refuse to stay, saying that they'll help in battle. Kyōshirō tries using blunt scolding to scare them to submission, but Weed tells them calmly that to die is not something fantastic and just because of a battle, the Ōu army has no right to snatch their future away from them and after they die, the pups will take over for them, to which the pups finally agree to stay behind with the Kōga elder. Tesshin and his clan of ninja dogs join the Ōu army. At Ōu, Akame spots some of Genba's minions going out to capture female dogs from humans for Hōgen, as he is arriving to Ōu. Akame informs dogs who are at Ōu and are part of the Ōu army about this and he takes Kurotora and Hook with him to stop the female hunting and sends Mel to inform Weed about the invasion of Ōu. On his way, Mel comes across Hōgen's army, which is carrying an injured Gin, and spies on them as Hōgen threatens the Ōu soldiers and some cowardly Ōu soldiers join him. Meanwhile, the Ōu army goes to Hōgen's hut in the Alps, unaware that Hōgen has already left with Gin. The assassins that failed to kill Kyōshirō, Lecter and Thunder, watch them from afar, before deciding that they should get Weed, since returning empty-handed to Hōgen would mean death for them. Weed and Tesshin sneak inside the hut, only to be ambushed by Lecter and Thunder. Due to their scuffle, they wake up the guards outside, but Lecter and Thunder order them to stay away. Thunder manages to grab Weed and knock away Tesshin, but Weed kicks him and uses an old knife lying in the hut to chop off Lecter's fangs. Tesshin throws them out of the hut and the Ōu army surrounds them as the guards escape. When asked about Gin, Lecter informs Weed that Hōgen took him to Ōu. Kyōshirō is about to kill both of them, but Weed orders their lives spared, only on the condition that they'll never work for Hōgen again. They agree and escape. Kyōshirō tries to kill them out of anger, but Jerome stops him, saying that he'll be Kyōshirō's opponent if he doesn't obey Weed. However, as they Ōu army leaves, Jerome stays behind, suspicious of the two assassins. At Ōu, Hōgen arrives at Gajō with Kamakiri and an injured Gin and is greeted by his brother, Genba. Jerome follows the two assassins and overhears them plotting to assassinate Weed and he kills mercilessly Lecter, as Lecter's scream arouses the attention of the Ōu army and they rush to the spot where Jerome is, only to see, Jerome pinning down Thunder. Weed demands that Jerome let him go, but Jerome quickly kills Thunder too, in front of a horrified Weed. Weed loses his temper at Jerome's disobedience and pins him down and throws him against a tree and says that orders Jerome to leave the pack, since he has become a killer all over again. Jerome, although shocked at Weed's extreme order, obeys him and quietly leaves. Kyōshirō blames Weed and says that Jerome was trying to protect him, but Weed says his opinion won't change. Kyōshirō and his pack decide to follow Jerome, thinking that Weed is a weakling for not being able to accept killing. However, when they find Jerome, he says that what Weed did is right, that he is more immature than Weed and that Kyōshirō's army should follow Weed, before leaving to recruit more dogs from Shikoku for the army.
17	"The Struggle In The Blizzard"; Transliteration: "Setsujō no shitō" (Japanese: 雪上の死闘)	March 9, 2006
At Gajō, the minions of Genba return empty-handed, defeated by Kurotora, Akame and Hook. Genba angrily orders Kamakiri to kill them for their failure, but Hōgen stops him and says that there are soldiers in his pack that are exceptionally strong and couldn't be stopped and orders the dogs to gather up the bravest of the dogs, planning to have them fight with one another to determine the top generals. As the Ōu army continue their journey, Kyōshirō's army follows them. Kyōshirō's army stumble across Mel, who mistakes them for enemies. Kyōshirō mistakes Mel for an enemy too and chase him. Mel reaches Weed's army and reports to him about the invasion of Ōu and the arrival of Hōgen after Weed introduces him to Kyōshirō. Mel says that a battle will take place at Futago Pass. Kyōshirō is hesitant to join Weed's army after what he is done, but joins in after being shocked at Weed thanking him for coming back even though left him. Weed is reminded of his anger at Jerome due to Kyōshirō's return. At Gajō, the top generals of Hōgen's army are determined: Kaito the greyhound, Batto the weimaraner, Buruge the black mouth cur and Tōbee the Tosa dog. Akame and the others hear the battle cries at Gajō and realize that the female hunting will begin again and one of the generals will come. The Ōu army reaches near Futago Pass and Weed takes Rocket, GB, Tesshin and Kyōshirō with him to Futago Pass and order Ken and Kagetora to lead the others away if the enemy strikes. Kurotora, Akame and Hook watch form afar as Genba sets out with Tōbee and some other soldiers to steal females. However, Genba's army comes face to face with Shigure, who has returned with the sons of Kisaragi the Siberian Husky from Mutsu. The sons of Kisaragi are: Izou, Shirozaku, Shinsaku, Shintaro, Kogoro and Hichinosuke. Genba orders Tōbee to kills them and a battle breaks out between the groups as Kame and the others join in. The six sons of Kisaragi try tackling Tōbee as Genba attacks Akame, but is pinned down Shigure and Kurotora, who are vengeful for their deceased family members. Genba throws away the two Kai Kens and pins down Akame but Weed, GB, Rocket, Kyōshirō and Tesshin arrive. Weed knocks away Genba and Genba demands to fight with him, but Tesshin stops him and says that he is enough of an opponent for Genba. The Great Dane arrogantly tries attacking Tesshin, but Tesshin, using the different ninja-dog techniques, makes deep cuts on Genba several times. Most of the dogs of Genba's army are defeated and Weed knocks away a dog attacking Izou, as one dog from Genba's army rushes to Hōgen to report about the danger. As the fight continues, Akame drags Izou to a safer place as he senses that a strong blizzard is going to blow any moment. Tōbee demands to fight Weed, since he is the leader. While Tōbee is fighting with Weed, Genba calls him to back him up, since Tōbee is the only one who is yet to be defeated in the army. Weed asks Genba if he would surrender, but Genba snaps that he would never surrender, when Kamakiri's army arrives at Futago Pass, having been sent by Hōgen to rescue Genba. Genba, gaining confidence after seeing the reinforcement, attacks Tesshin as Tōbee attacks Weed. Genba manages to pin down Tesshin, but Shigure knocks him away and they stand at the edge of a cliff. Tesshin gives Genba one last chance to surrender and redeem himself, but Genba refuses, at which Tesshin and Shigure grab his shoulders and push him off the cliff along with themselves. Kamakiri and Weed's army run towards one another to attack, when the strong blizzard, Akame had predicted would come, blows out on them, blurring everything and stopping them from having a battle. During the blizzard, Tesshin, Shigure and Genba roll down the cliff and as the reach the bottom of the cliff, Shigure and Tesshin jump away from Genba and Genba hits his head on a rock, badly wounding him. Both Kamakiri and Weed's army are forced to withdraw. In the morning, Tesshin and Shigure returns and Shigure tells his uncle that he has gotten revenge for his brothers. Tesshin says that while they didn't kill Genba, he probably wouldn't be able to return to the battlefield ever again. At the bottom of the cliff, some dogs digs up Genba from the snow as Kamakiri and Tōbee watches. Genba suddenly wakes up from his unconsciousness and attacks one of his own soldiers before falling down again. Tōbee and Kamakiri realize that Genba has been brain-damaged so much that he has gotten memory loss and will attack anything around him. Tōbee is horrified at Genba's state, but Kamakiri feels delighted at Genba's downfall, thinking he can now take Genba's place as Number 2 of Hōgen's army.
18	"An Outcry To A Friend"; Transliteration: "Tomo heno sakebi" (Japanese: 友への叫び)	March 16, 2006
At Gajō, Hōgen mourns over his brother's injuries and demands to know who did this to his brother. Suddenly, Genba wakes up and starts attacking the dogs around him and Hōgen realizes that Genba is too brain-damaged to recognize even his own brother and has become aggressive towards everything around him. Genba suddenly bites onto Hōgen, who comments on how his own brother can't even recognize him. Hōgen tearfully bids his brother farewell before biting onto Genba's head and swiftly killing him out of mercy as Tōbee and the other dogs watch, horrified. As Genba lies dead on the floor, Hōgen licks his dead brother's cheeks out of sadness as he remembers how they were born in an old shack, where the breeder left them and some other dogs without food, and they had to resort to cannibalism to survive. When the breeder came back, he was killed by the one-year old Hōgen and Genba and eaten. After that, the brothers had made a promise that whoever of them was going to die first, he would die from the surviving brother's fangs and the promise was being executed now. In present, the dogs of Genba's army begin to sense that an angry episode was going to breakout and two dogs try leaving, saying that they need to treat some injuries. Hōgen furiously kills them both and as the other dogs escape, he orders them pinned down and kills all of them as Tōbee tries fighting him, but Hōgen defeats him, making him one-eyed. He throws out the corpses of the dogs and a still alive Tōbee down into the river in the gorge. At a hidden location, Akame introduces Weed's army to Ben and Cross. The Ōu army spots Kamakiri's army trying to find them by scent. Weed thinks up a plan to lure and trick them and takes Rocket with him. They purposefully come out in front of Kamakiri's army and Kamkiri's army begins chasing them, as Kamakiri delightfully thinks about getting Hōgen's position after capturing Weed, now that he has gotten Genba's position. Weed and Rocket lead his army into a small ravine, where many of his soldiers fall into it. Kamakiri furiously begins chasing after them with his army. Weed hides under a very narrow river, going unnoticed by Kamakiri's army and when they are far away, he gets up and goes to recruit his own army. Rocket leads Kamakiri's army through the same paths over and over again, without them realizing it until after a very long time. Suddenly, Weed's army appears on the cliff in front of them, with Rocket, spread out all over the edge of the cliff to give the false impression that they were larger in number than Kamakiri's army and that there were more soldiers behind them. Weed gives Kamakiri's army a chance to leave, but Kamakiri furiously says that to withdraw would a dishonor and that he was still ready to fight. However, another group of dogs appear at the edge of the cliff, scaring Kamakiri and making him bleieve that there were actually a huge number of soldiers behind the few on the cliff edge. On top of that, GB, Ken and Kagetora start running in circles and saying that they had come from Hokuriku to help the Ōu army, giving the impression that more dogs were coming to join the army. Kamakiri finally gets too scared to fight anymore and begrudgingly leaves with his army. Weed is then introduced to the group of dogs, which's leader are Moss the English Mastiff and Musashi the Tosa dog, both of whom were old Ōu comrades. Moss informs Weed that Jerome informed them about the problem and called them here. He tells Weed that Jerome separated from them on their way to meet Weed. Weed senses that Jerome is nearby and when everyone decides to search for him, Jerome leaves with four Shikoku dogs Musashi had placed with him to protect him. Weed is placed in an emotional struggle, as he cannot forget or forgive Jerome and both Jerome and he begin to cry as the move further away from each other.
19	"A Fool's Disposition"; Transliteration: "Orokamono no iji" (Japanese: 愚か者の意地)	March 23, 2006
As they are returning to their own secret location, the Ōu army comes across a desperate dog called Shingo, who says that his friend is drowning. Kyōshirō identifies the dog as one of Hōgen's soldiers and is suspicious of him, but Weed and the others rush to help the dog who is drowning. The Ōu army arrives at the spot where the dog leads them to and find that the dog in danger is Tōbee. Everyone jumps into the river to help him and drag him up, as Musashi looks from afar. At Gajō, Hōgen is shocked to hear that the Ōu army has gathered over 300 soldiers and in anger almost chokes Kamakiri to death and warns him that if he fails in the next mission, he will be killed. In the Ōu army's secret location, Moss, Musahsi and the other old Ōu comrades weep after seeing the fang of the deceased John, which Hook has delivered to Ōu. Mel informs them that Tōbee has awoken and while Weed tells Tōbee that he is glad that Tōbee survived, Tōbee bluntly asks him if expects him to change sides for saving him. Musashi comes to talk to him and it is revealed that during his days as a fighting dog, Musashi was defeated only by Tōbee. Musashi demands to know why such a determined and respectable dog like Tōbee joined Hōgen's army, to which Tōbee replied that when he heard that Musashi was in the battlefield with the Ōu army, he himself wanted to fight in the battlefield too and when he saw that being with Hōgen's army could give him that opportunity, he joined it. Tōbee tells the Ōu army about Genba and his soldiers' death before walking out, claiming that he wanted to take revenge on Hōgen for treating Him so badly. Weed says he should rest first and Tōbee refuses at first, but due to exhaustion falls and becomes unconscious and is dragged back to the secret location. The dogs who escaped from Hōgen's army when they saw what he did to Tōbee, Shingo and Kerry thank the Ōu army for taking care of them and decide to go back to their homelands instead of joining Hōgen again. Shingo tells the Ōu army about Hōgen and Genba's cruel and cannibalistic past before going. On their way to their hometown, Kerry advises that they should join Hōgen's army again and report to him that the Ōu army has much less than even 200 soldiers, to which Shingo is horrified, but Jerome jumps out on Kerry and threatens to kill him if he does anything like that and both Shingo and Kerry quickly escape in fear. The Ōu army sits down to have their meals and GB offers Tōbee a bird, but Tōbee says he doesn't like bird-meat, to which GB sets out to find a snake for him. He doesn't find any snakes but sees a mouse and as he tries to catch it, he bumps with another dog and soon another dog comes and finds them. GB realizes that he has accidentally entered the enemy territory and introduces himself as a follower of Hōgen called Jinbei. He finds some food and is forced to take it along with the other followers of Hōgen into Gajō. While searching for an exit, GB comes across the chamber where an unconscious and weak Gin is kept. He comes outside Gajō and comes across Sasuke, his old friend. Meanwhile, at the secret location of the Ōu army, Weed, Ken and Kagetora begin to worry about GB when he doesn't return and they go out to find him. Musashi asks Tōbee how their leader is and Tōbee replies that he's an idiot. However, Ben and Cross question whether he really thinks that. Back near Gajō, GB and Sasuke have a friendly conversation and Sasuke reveals how he couldn't find his owner and was captured by Hōgen's minions and was forced to work to death for him. GB and Sasuke plan to escape Hōgen's army, but the two dogs who bumped into GB from before finds out about this and Sasuke lets it slip that JinBei is not actually GB's name. The two minions of Hōgen give them a chase and catch Sasue and GB tries to rescue him. Ken, Kagetora and Weed arrive at the scene and rescue Sasuke and GB, who loses consciousness due to tension. They go back with Sauske to the Ōu army and GB wakes up and informs Weed about the place Gin's kept in. Sasuke lets it slip that GB is Weed's godfather, embarrassing the English Setter. Tōbee decides to join the army since both of their goals are to take down Hōgen.
20	"The Ōu Suicide Corps"; Transliteration: "Ōu kesshitai" (Japanese: 奥羽決死隊)	March 30, 2006
At Gajō, Hōgen tortures Gin out of rage that the Ōu spies in his army have escaped, although Kamakiri advises him not to kill Gin, since he is their last valuable hostage. Hōgen, having had enough of the Ōu army's tricks, goes out with the whole of his army to find the Ōu army. At the Ōu army's secret location, GB pinpoints exactly where Gin is using sticks and stones to build a map and Akame encourages everyone to fight with courage, when Shigure and Kagetora's brothers come and report about Hōgen setting out of Gajō to catch the Ōu army. He has dived his army into five groups. The first group is led by Hōgen himself, the second group is led by Kamakiri, the third group is led by Kaito the greyhound from Ecchu, the fourth group is led by Batto the weimaraner of Shingan and the fifth division is led by Buruge the black mouth cur of Yashamori. Weed orders Rocket to go and find where Hōgen exactly is and Rocket sees Hōgen coming from the front and telling his group to rest before Kamakiri's group builds a barrier. Rocket reports this to Weed and Weed decides to go with a small army and create a chaos and use the Battōga to kill Hōgen. He chooses Akame, Tesshin, Rocket, Kagetora, Ken, Shigure, Kagetora's brothers, Kisaragi's sons and the Tesshin's clan of ninja dogs to go with him. Kyōshirō is furious that he isn't chosen to go with Weed, but Weed says that he doesn't have the ability to quickly escape and therefore he cannot take him. Cross, Ken's mother, leads the rest of the army to a safer place as Weed and the others depart to attack Hōgen. Weed sees Hōgen for the first time and feels anger boiling up inside him. As the rest of the army led by Cross swim along the river, Reika points out that Kyōshirō and his army is missing. Meanwhile, Kyōshirō and his army arrogantly try to go towards Gajō to rescue the leader, thinking they're being excluded because they are too young, when they run across Jerome, who tells Kyōshirō that he really is immature. Meanwhile, Weed's squad attack Hōgen's group as one dog howls for backup troops to arrive. As the others take down Hōgen's bodyguards and leave him open to attacks, Weed launches a Zetsu Tenrō Battōga at Hōgen, who gets paralyzed in fear and seemingly beheads and kills him as his corpse falls limp on the ground. Weed's squad quickly escapes, as Kamakiri and Kaito's group arrive and get shocked at seeing Hōgen's corpse. Meanwhile, Kyōshirō decides to go to Gajō alone and when he sees that his army won't go if he just told them to, Kyōshirō's treats them violently and acts like he's going to join Hōgen. Kyōshirō's own army tries to attack him, but seeing one of Hōgen's troops coming, they escape tearfully. Kyōshirō weeps about they've become determined and strong before he even noticed, when he comes across one of Hōgen's troops, led by Buruge. Meanwhile, Jerome watches from afar, him and his bodyguards being the only one knowing that Kyōshirō really hasn't betrayed the Ōu army and was just acting. Kyōshirō gives Buruge a false identity of himself, introducing himself as Tasuke from Kyoto, who came here to become one of Hōgen's comrades. Meanwhile, Weed and the others make their way through the river, Weed reveals that hadn't been actually able to kill Hōgen. Back at the scene where the attack took place, Kamakiri, Kaito and their armies are shocked again to see Hōgen rising up from the ground. Hōgen comments softly on Weed's 'strange technique' and it is revealed that when Weed was launching the Battōga on him, Hōgen managed to catch a dog from his own army and place him in front of himself, so that the Battōga hit the other dog. Kyōshirō's army go back to the Ōu army and report about Kyōshirō's betrayal, although Weed doesn't believe that Kyōshirō betrayed them and believes that Kyōshirō has other intentions. Hōgen's army find out that the Ōu army had jumped into the river and escaped and Hōgen orders Kamakiri and his army to search the entire river and find the Ōu army. The Ōu army wonders who will go to check if Kyōshirō has really betrayed them or not and Tōbee offers to do that job. Mel says that everyone will be waiting for him as Tōbee disappears quietly.
21	"Infiltrating Gajō"; Transliteration: "Gajō sennyū" (Japanese: 牙城潜入)	April 6, 2006
On his way to Gajō, Tōbee spots Kamakiri's army at the river and comes across Jerome who assures him that Kyōshirō hasn't betrayed them. Jerome says that if he goes to Hōgen's place, he will die, but Tōbee says that he is not going to fall out like weakling and approaches Kamakiri, who decides to take him back to Gajō. At Gajō, Buruge's troop comes back with Kyōshirō as a part of it. However, Batt, who is blind, senses Kyōshirō's true intentions with something he calls his 'mind's eye' and points him out as an enemy spy. Hōgen's attacks Kyōshirō viciously even though Buruge tries defending him meekly. However, Tōbee arrives with Kamakiri's army and he requests Hōgen to let him kill Kyōshirō. As they fight, Tōbee reveals his true intentions about rescuing the leader and Kyōshirō, as a part of the act, jumps and reveals his true identity. Tōbee knocks Kyōshirō unconscious, telling Hōgen that it would be better to execute him in front of the whole Ōu army. However, Batto sees through Tōbee's true intentions and warns Hōgen about it and Hōgen takes Kamakiri with him for a talk. Kyōshirō is kept in the same chamber Gin is kept in and at night, a snowstorm begins, causing all the guards to go to sleep and allowing Tōbee to freely walk into the chamber. However, Batto's guards see him and Batto reports to Hōgen about this and Hōgen orders him to chase after them and recapture Gin, but not kill him. Meanwhile, Weed and Akame go through a secret passageway inside Gajō to help Kyōshirō and Tōbee with their mission. Meanwhile, right above them, Batto's army rushes towards the chamber where the hostages are kept and due to the rocks being loose, some dogs fall underneath and into the secret passageway, coming face to face with Weed who starts acting as a distraction while Akame runs to rescue Gin. As Kyōshirō and Tōbee are rescuing Gin, they come face to face with Kamakiri's army, having set up there by Hōgen. Akame quickly appears and leads Kyōshirō and Tōbee away with Gin and drops huge rocks in the passageway, blocking away Kamakiri's army. As his army is chasing Weed, Batto senses something wrong with his mind's eye and orders half of his team to go after Weed, while the other half comes with him to where he thinks the problem is. The 'problem' is the actually Akame, Kyōshirō and Tōbee escaping with Gin and as they hear Batto's army coming, Akame orders Kyōshirō and Tōbee to go away with Gin, which they do, while he stays behind and when Batto's army arrives at the scene, Akame jumps on icicles on the chamber's rooftop, dropping them at Batto's army and he escapes through another passage and Batto's army follows. Meanwhile, hearing the commotion in Gajō, Hōgen decides to see what's going on. Akame meets up with Weed as they escape from Batto's army and as they use a passageway that leads them to a higher place on Gajō and they and come outside, Weed comes face to face with Hōgen, but manages to escape. Kamakiri's army reaches the chamber where the icicles had been dropped on Batto's army a moment ago and go through the same secret passageway Tōbee and Kyōshirō had used. As they hear Kamakiri's army coming, Tōbee tells Kyōshirō to carry Gin and go away, while he blocks Kamakiri's army, to which Kyōshirō complies with hesitation. Kamakiri's army arrives and begins to viciously attack Tōbee, who tries to make the dogs see the pointlessness of being in Hōgen's army, but at that, they begin attacking him in more numbers. At the Ōu army's secret location, Musashi, Hiro and GB begin to worry about Tōbee and Kyōshirō being late and decide to go and check what has happened, as Kyōshirō reaches the river, carrying Gin. At the fight scene, Kamakiri's army is unable to bring down Tōbee as Kamakiri watches in dismay and the fighting dog kills twenty-seven of Kamakiri's soldiers, but in the end, Kamakiri launches a surprise attack on him, sinking his fangs into Tōbee's skull and paralyzing him. However, Tōbee refuses to fall down in front of Kamakiri's army and stands with pride, shocking Kamakiri for a moment before he goes off with his army to find Gin and Kyōshirō. Jerome and his Shikoku dog bodyguards, Ryū, Ryō, Hanji and Heita arrive at the scene and when Tōbee is about to fall, they hold him desperately as Jerome starts to cry. While of Kyōshirō's back, Gin senses that Tōbee might have died. In the morning, GB, Hiro and Musashi arrive to see the corpses of Kamakiri's twenty-seven soldiers and the corpse of Tōbee, who has died standing in pride and was frozen in a layer of ice.
22	"Father And Son"; Transliteration: "Chichi to ko to" (Japanese: 父と子と)	April 13, 2006
Kyōshirō arrives at the riverbank with Gin, but far from the Ōu army. Kamkiri's army desperately searches for them, as Stone, Kamkiri's assistant asks his boss whether he should report the escape of Kyōshirō and Gin to Hōgen or not and Kamakiri angrily snaps at him and sends him to Hōgen. He then orders a part of his army to split up and find Kyōshirō and Gin, as Jerome and his bodyguards watch from afar and Jerome sends one of his bodyguards, Ryō to report this to the Ōu army. As Weed and Akame arrive at the Ōu army's secret location, everyone comes out to greet them, but Weed is surprised that Gin and Kyōshirō still haven't arrived. GB, Hiro and Musashi report about Tōbee's death and they mourn for him when Rocket suddenly appears with Ryō and reports about Kamakiri's search for Gin and Kyōshirō. Weed takes GB, Ken, Kagetora, Tesshin, all the Kai kens except Kurotora and Tesshin's clan of ninja dogs to go with him and rescue Gin and Kyōshirō. Although Hiro wants to come, Weed tells him they are not going there to defeat Kamakiri and that he should stay back. At Gajō, Hōgen kills Stone when he brings him the news about the hostages escaping and orders Kaito, Batto and Buruge to strengthen their armies and protect Gajō. Meanwhile, a small part of Kamakiri's army come near Kyōshirō and Gin and Kyōshirō hides Gin and attacks them all by himself but they manage to pin him down and as the Ōu army passes them by, they hide with him and keep him quiet. Back at the Ōu army's secret location, Hiro decides to go and help the Ōu army, since Kamakiri killed his father once and now he considers Gin his father and Kamakiri is now after his second father, and he requests Reika to tell everyone that he didn't disobey Weed but rather put his life in line to protect the leader. While on their search for Gin and Kyōshirō, Weed and the others run straight into Kamakiri's army and a battle breaks out between the two armies. Meanwhile, Hiro reaches the small group of Kamakiri's soldiers who are torturing Kyōshirō to know where Gin is and brutally castrates most of them. Hiro tells Kyōshirō to take leader back to the Ōu army's secret location, but Kyōshirō refuses, saying that he can't lose over and over again. Hiro then tells him about Tōbee's death and tells Kyōshirō that the leader is the father of everyone in the pack, so he should take care of him and leaves, while Kyōshirō takes the leader back. Meanwhile, Kamakiri's army fight mercilessly with Weed's smaller army. Hiro arrives and informs Weed that the leader is alright and starts attacking Kamakiri in revenge for his father. The two dogs fight vigorously and Kamakiri says he is aiming to rule the world and that he'll let Hiro meet his father in the other world. Hiro uses a trick to lure Kamakiri and then chop of his fangs and then castrate him, making him humiliated and unable to fight back. With the downfall of their boss, Kamakiri's army flees in fear and Kamakiri helplessly calls out at them to stop and when they disappear, starts fuming with rage and grief at his defeat. As Weed's army leaves, Hiro advises Kamakiri to let the feelings of others sink in and become a better person and to head south, where there are rats, something he'll be able to catch even without his fangs. In extreme anger, Kamakiri tries to bite Hiro as he leaves, but loses grip due to the absence of his fangs and falls down. Tears begin forming in his eyes and he is left lying on the ground, screaming in anger and grief but ultimately succumbing to blood loss as crows begin to surround him to eat him. Weed's army finds Kyōshirō and Gin and carry them back home as Weed and Hiro begin to feel the warmth of their fathers; the former for finding him and the latter for defeating the murderer of his father.
23	"The War Of Futago Pass Begins"; Transliteration: "Kaisen futago tōge" (Japanese: 開戦 二子峠)	April 20, 2006
Kyōshirō and Gin are taken back to Ōu army's secret location, where Hiro cheerfully declares the defeat of Kamakiri by him. Reika and Mel take him to rest, while GB takes Gin from Akame and go to put him in a nearby hot spring. The old Ōu soldiers finally are relieved that Gin is alright. Weed wants Kyōshirō to rest too, but Kyōshirō refuses, saying he is ready to fight. Meanwhile, Hōgen has got his army to surround the whole of Gajō and protect it. Batto's troop is at the far back in the forest, Kaito's troop is behind that and near Gajō's back and Buruge's troop is in the front. A small group of Kamakiri's soldiers come back and inform Hōgen about their boss's downfall, to which Hōgen realizes why the crows were throwing a tantrum in the last spot Kamakiri was seen. Hōgen mercilessly orders his soldiers to kill the few of Kamakiri's soldiers that have come back, calling them victims of the Ōu army. Weed and Rocket watch this from afar and go back to their group, organizing the armies. Weed divides his army into three troops, just like Hōgen and tells them to take down the generals of each troop, since if the general loses, his army will flee. The first one is led by Tesshin, whose troop consists of his clan of ninja dogs and Moss and Musashi's army from Shikoku, the second one is led by Ken and Kagetora, whose troop consists of their family members, Kisaragi's sons and a group of dogs from Mutsu and the second one is led by Kyōshirō, whose troop consists of his entire army of youngsters along with Hook and Sasuke. Weed himself will go with Akame and Rocket to launch an ambush attack on Hōgen from the inside of Gajō. As the Ōu army proceeds to attack Hōgen's army, Akame senses a storm coming and soon, the snow storm starts and battle also begins. The old parents of Ken and Kagetora are easily able to jump the gorge near Gajō along with Hook and Sasuke. Jerome and his group of bodyguards decide to help the Ōu army, when Jerome starts to feel the bullet in his leg paralyzing it, as he remembers Tesshin's words about it becoming an infection but goes to help Weed and the others anyway. The battle finally begins as Ken and Kagetora's troop creates a chaos in Batto's army, allowing Tesshin's troop to move forward undisturbed and attack Kaito's troop. Meanwhile, Kyōshirō's army runs straight into Buruge's army and Buruge and Kyōshirō start to fight viciously. Weed, Rocket and Akame get through the guards of Gajō and closer towards Hōgen, who is right at the top of Gajō. Kyōshirō and Buruge continue to fight and seemingly, Kyōshirō wins. But Buruge, although heavily injured, gets up and bites Kyōshirō. Buruge recounts how during his struggle to become one of Hōgen's generals, he used a technique that made it look like he was defeated to his enemies when he would suddenly jump up and kill them. He calls himself a shinigami and using his surprise attack method, pins down Kyōshirō. Kyōshirō remembers all time Weed had trusted him and wonders whether he is completely different to him. However, Tōbee's spirit help him to gain strength and determination and using Buruge's own method against him he pushes him away. Buruge, who thought Kyōshirō was long defeated, gets too shocked by this action and Kyōshirō puts a final blow on him to make sure he is defeated. As Buruge's army flees, Buruge begs Kyōshirō to kill him since he lost for the first time, but Kyōshirō says that according to Weed, the battle ends right after the general is defeated. Hōgen, seeing the downfall of Buruge's troop, orders his remaining army to protect the front when he notices that Weed is absent from all the Ōu army troops. Hōgen realizes what Weed's plan is and when Weed, Rocket and Akame come out, they see Hōgen jumping purposefully into the gorge.
24	"A War Of Fire And Snow"; Transliteration: "Honō yuki no kessen" (Japanese: 炎雪の決戦)	April 27, 2006
Weed and Rocket go down to tackle Hōgen as Kaito goes after them and Akame goes to take care of the battlefield. Before starting the fight, Weed asks Hōgen what his goal in doing all of this is and Hōgen replies that this ultimate goal is to take revenge on the humans after having enough dogs on his side, due to Genba and his past trauma. The Great Dane attacks Weed while Kaito fights with Rocket and in the battlefield, Tesshin interrogates one of Kaito's soldiers and gets to know where Kaito has gone. Ken, Kagetora and their family members defeat a large part of Batto's troop and Ken, Kagetora and Shigure run after where they think Batto is. During the battle in the gorge, Weed launches a Battōga at Hōgen and Hōgen tries dodging it, but Weed changes direction, pushing Hougne right into the river, where he floats away and falls from the waterfall. Kaito, angry at his boss's downfall, prepares to attack Weed and Rocket, as Weed asks whether Kaito hates humans too and Kaito replies that he does. However, Tesshin intervenes, allowing the two to escape, as Rocket warns him about Kaito's front legs, which can cut through rocks. Kaito and Tesshin prepare to fight again. In the forest where Batto's army is, a forest fire breaks out as Ken, Kagetora and Shigure get lured into a dead end, where Batto's army is waiting for them. However, Jerome's bodyguards arrive and fight off the remainder of Batto's army as Batto senses it with his mind's eye. Ben senses the presence of Batto with his own senses and inform Kurotora and Cross about it. Meanwhile, Tesshin and Kaito continue their fight and enter the forest where the forest fire has started as the flames begin to spread and Tesshin senses that Kaito's front legs might be artificial and Kaito reveals his past of an assassin working for the humans. Kurotora, Ben and Cross reach where Batto is and defeat his messengers. Cross runs off to bring Ken and Kagetora, while Ben and Kurotora try cornering Batt, but the weimaraner is too strong and he defeats Kurotora easily as a snowstorm blows out on them, giving Batto more advantage. In the forest, Kaito and Tesshin fight, jumping form tree to tree as Tesshin is unable to convince Kaito to leave Hōgen's army. Tesshin then breaks a tree branch which has caught fire on its tip and shoves it into Kaito, burning the covering of his front legs, revealing them to be made of metal and realizes his reasons for hating humans. Cross arrives with Ken and Kagetora and they find Ben guarding a fallen Kutora. They get angry and scream at Batto to come out, as he makes a sudden surprise attack, injuring them both. Ben advises them to calm themselves, since Batto is not an enemy who could be fought with blind anger and strength, and tells them to use their other senses to detect him. They soon do and as he is making an attacking, they injure and defeat him. In the forest, Tesshin embeds the branch he is carrying into Kaito's collar, as the greyhound furiously chases after him. However, Kaito gets caught in the trees due to the branch getting stuck in his collar and almost chokes to death, but Tesshin saves him. Kaito, although violent at first, is moved by Tesshin's kindness. Ben and Kurotora tell Batto that Ōu doesn't kill someone for being their enemy and gives them a second chance and both Batto and Kaito begin shedding tears of regret. Meanwhile, far away in the gorge, Hōgen gets out of the river and runs straight into Mel, Reika and Hiro. Hōgen defeats Mel and Hiro, but Reika requests him not to kill her as she has fallen in love with him due to his youthfulness. Hōgen delightfully starts walking away with her, but Reika pushes him back into the river, having tricked him. Hiro and Mel, unable to get up due to their injuries, scream for help and Jerome appears suddenly and jumps into the river to save Reika.
25	"The Raging Stream"; Transliteration: "Gekiryū" (Japanese: 激流)	May 4, 2006
Weed and Rocket arrive at the place where Mel and Hiro are and they tell them about the incident that took place a moment ago. Weed orders Rocket to take care of the two, as he goes to fight Hōgen. In the river, Hōgen uses Reika as a support and gets back on land as Jerome swims after Reika. He grabs her and holds onto a rock as Weed arrives and holds out a branch at him and drag them back onto land. Weed goes after Hōgen while Jerome wakes Reika up and calls for his bodyguards to take care of her. Hōgen stumbles upon a Great Dane called Harunosuke, who has escaped from Batto's army after Batto's defeat. Hōgen allows him to escape and then disguises Harunosuke's footprints as his own while wiping out his actual footsteps. Weed comes and falls for Hōgen's trick and goes at the direction Harunosuke went. However, Jerome comes soon after him and is able to catch Hōgen's trick by recognizing the difference of scent between Harunosuke and Hōgen and seeing the branch Hōgen used to wipe away his own footprints. Weed spots Harunosuke and mistakes him for Hōgen and launches a Battōga at him, but only covering him in ice as a result. When asked about Hōgen, Harunosuke tells Weed where he last saw him and Weed rushes back. Meanwhile, back at Ōu army's secret location, GB watches Gin getting better when he suddenly sees Kaito, Batto and Buruge behind him. He mistakes them for enemies, but Sasuke arrives and tells him that they had been defeated and he was told to bring them here. Gin tells the three to get into the hot spring he's in, since it can heal wounds easily, and Kaito, Batto and Buruge, moved deeply by the leader's kindness, begin to cry out of regret before going into the hot spring. Gin tells GB to go to where Weed is and GB obeys immediately. As the older Ōu comrades fight the remainder of Hōgen's army, Ken, Kagetora, Tesshin and Kyōshirō rushes after Weed with two of Jerome's bodyguards, Ryū and Ryō, while the other two escort Reika to the battlefield. On his way to find Weed, GB spots Hōgen and arrogantly attacks him, but gets pinned down easily. Jerome arrives and saves GB and introduces himself to Hōgen. Hōgen recognizes him as the murderer of Lecter and Thunder and prepares to fight him, but GB grabs one of his hind legs, distracting him as Jerome jumps down on him and pushes him right at the river. However, just as Jerome is about to push Hōgen into the river, the bullet in his leg causes immense pain and paralyzes him, causing him to let go of Hōgen. Hōgen, in intense anger, grabs him and beats him against rocks and as Weed arrives, throws him into the river, laughing maniacally. Weed jumps into the river to save Jerome as Hōgen leaves without harming GB. The river leads into a snow-covered cave and Weed and Jerome hold onto some rocks as the water flows past them. Ken, Kagetora and the others arrive to see an injured GB, who is doubtful about Jerome and Weed surviving the 500 meters of snow that lay ahead of them. Weed and Jerome apologize to each other and Weed comments on how cold it is and Jerome tells him about the spring of Ōu to cheer him up. Due to the coldness, Weed falls unconscious and Jerome desperately tries to keep Weed's head above water, keeping his own body submerged in water underneath Weed. Above them, Ken, Kagetora and the others search for them and Kyōshirō smells blood and locates them. As they desperately dig through snow to rescue them, Jerome, who has taken in too much water to save Weed, feels relieved that everyone has arrived and Weed can be alright. He lets go and drifts away from Weed. He tells his past friends like North, Robert, Rocker, Heuler and even Kaibutsu to wait for him in the other world as he drowns in the river and floats away.
26	"Makoto Ginga Densetsu" (Japanese: 真・銀牙伝説)	May 11, 2006
Weed wakes up from his unconsciousness, surrounded by Kyōshirō, Tesshin, GB, Ken and Kagetora, who are huddling close to him to keep him warm. He questions where Jerome is and when he doesn't get a proper answer, he jumps away from them and see Ryū and Ryō and question where Jerome is again. Ryō tearfully tells him that Jerome is nowhere to be found and probably deceased and Weed starts to mourn over the loss of one of his closest friends. Meanwhile, the older Ōu comrades, along with Hiro, Mel and Rocket, who have gone back to the battlefield, defeat the remainder of Hōgen's army and Akame and Kurotora defeats the last dogs guarding ht Gajō and take over it. However, Hōgen arrives to launch a surprise attack. As Weed and the others rush back to Gajō, they see the damage the forest fire and the war has caused to their army. They arrive to see Hōgen standing the middle of the Ōu army, having killed many dogs who challenged him, including many of Tesshin's ninja dogs. Ryō and Ryū angrily attack at him but he kills Ryū with one strike of his fangs and holds Ryō hostage. He challenges Weed into a fight and Weed accepts it and Hōgen lets Ryō go and prepares for the fight. Weed swiftly comes down and fakes a Battōga to trick Hōgen and then begins to use multiple jumps to cut him all over. Finally, he uses a Battōga on Hōgen to seemingly kill the Great Dane. However, Hōgen gets up, still alive after taking a Battōga and everyone tries to protect Weed, but Gin arrives to stop them and tells Weed to show the strength and spirit he is supposed to have. Weed tries to launch another Battōga on Hōgen, but the strong wind pushes him down and Hōgen grabs his legs, beating him continuously on the ground. However, Weed manages to bite Hōgen over and over right on the head as Hōgen continues to give him the beating, getting more violent and furious with each bite to the head. After the final bite to the head, Hōgen beats him ruthlessly and throws him away, burying him in the snow. Everyone again tries interfering to save Weed, but Gin stops them, saying that this was only between the leaders. Hōgen laughs at him mockingly and gives Weed a last death blow to kill him. Weed lies seemingly dead as everyone rushes to him to check whether his really dead or not and Hōgen laughs in victory at Gin. However, the wind begins to blow heavily and they hear howling sounds form the mountains and Weed soon gains back his strength with the help of the spirits of the past dead Ōu comrades and they begin to appear around Weed and Hōgen, visible only to them, scaring Hōgen witless, especially when he sees John among the spirits. Weed launches a Battōga at Hōgen, who is too terrified to fight him anymore, and the Great Dane manages to dodge it. However, strong wind blows out on them suddenly and Weed comes back at Hōgen with his Battōga and sinks his fangs right onto Hōgen's head. Hōgen finally falls down, finally defeated. Everyone praises Weed for defeating him, but Reika points out that Hōgen is still alive and Gin tells Weed to kill him to end the war, but Weed says he can't do it, so Gin tries to do it on his own. However, Weed stops him, saying that this kind of merciless killing will only lead to more wars and kindness is the only thing that could affect one to change. Gin, seeing that Weed has surpassed him, declares Weed the leader and the Ōu army bows down before him to acknowledge him as the leader. However, they soon find that Hōgen is missing from his place and finds him at the top of Gajō, furious about his defeat and screaming at them. However, as he starts to laugh and declare that it was still his reign, he struck by a bolt of lightning and dies. Soon, the spring of Ōu comes and a funeral is held for all the soldiers who had died in the battle and Hōgen is buried among the soldiers. Weed has a vision of Jerome standing in the beautiful field but it vanishes in seconds. Soon after, Mel, Kyōshirō and GB come to call him, addressing him as the leader and saying that everyone is waiting for him. Weed soon gets up to go with them.

== Reception ==
As of 2013, Weed had over 20 million copies in circulation.

The 55th volume of Weed was listed as number 30 on the Oricon sales chart in Japan for the week December 9–15, 2008. Its sales numbers for the week were 20,059 copies, for a cumulative total of 21,320 since its release.

Weed was featured on Jason Thompson's House of 1000 Manga segment on Anime News Network. He praised the series for its story and took note of the "flavor" of having a combination of physically realistic dogs, "tropes", the dogs' knowledge of the human world (such as job occupations and dog breeds), and dog behavior involving honor, loyalty, honorifics, and auras. Thompson stated "the story is the point. If dogs are like humans, they are humans who are treated like slaves, separated from their kin, and forced to fight and hunt to survive. And that makes for some good drama. As Weed and his friends pursue their dream, they discover disturbing hints that the "dog utopia" might have turned into a dystopia". Overall, Thompson felt that the series was unique, stating that "no one else [is] making manga quite like this." In a later installment of House of 1000 Manga, Thompson expressed his preference for Takahashi's original work, Silver Fang -The Shooting Star Gin-, stating that it felt "more exciting and natural" than its "stiffer and more pompous" sequel.

== Other series ==
=== Ginga Densetsu Riki ===
In 2002, Takahashi began publishing Ginga Densetsu Riki (銀牙伝説リキ; lit. Silver Fang Legend Riki), a prequel to Weed and Silver Fang -The Shooting Star Gin-. It was originally serialized in the Weed World(ウィードWORLD), published by Nihon Bungeisha, between March 31, 2002 and December 10, 2002. In March 2003, Nihon Bungeisha released the collected chapters in a single book and in December 2005, it was included in the omnibus Ginga Densetsu Weed Tokubetsu Han with Weed Gaiden. Since then has been reprinted twice: 2007 and 2015. The one-shot follows Riki, father of Gin and former leader of the Ōu soldiers. Riki, though sired by the prized bear hound Shiro, is born a runt and never homed. After his mother Yamabuki is returned to her owner, Riki, stricken with sadness, decides to visit her.

During his trek, Riki is attacked by a pack of dogs and falls into a river. Riki is rescued by his father, Shiro, who advises him about the importance of strength and leaves, not knowing Riki is his son. Influenced by Shiro, Riki aims to become strong and continually visits his mother. On a later trip, Riki sees a young boy, Daisuke, hit by a truck on a mountain road and sent over the road railing. Riki howls for help, but instead attracts the dogs that had attacked him. Riki defends Daisuke until Shiro and his owner, Gohee, arrive. Shiro learns that Riki is his son. The book ends with Gohee and Shiro fighting the bear Akakabuto. A bullet becomes lodged in Akakabuto's brain, driving him insane. Riki watches as the bear grabs Shiro and they fall off a cliff.

=== Ginga Densetsu Weed: Orion ===
Takahashi began a sequel to Weed, entitled Ginga Densetsu Weed: Orion (銀牙伝説ウィード オリオン, Ginga Densetsu Wīdo: Orion; lit. Silver Fang Legend Weed: Orion), in issue #2173 of Manga Goraku, released on July 24, 2009. The first collected volume was released by Nihon Bungeisha in November 2009 and last July 2014. The new series follows Weed's offspring: Bellatrix, Rigel, Sirius, and, in particular, Orion. They are all named after astronomical phenomenon: Orion after the Orion constellation, Rigel after the star Rigel, Sirius after the star Sirius, and Bellatrix after the star Bellatrix. Orion bears a close physical resemblance to Riki and possesses an inborn strength, but is rude and hot-headed. Rigel shares his fiery personality, while Sirius, who resembles his father, is level-headed and a peace-keeper. Bellatrix, Weed's only daughter, is portrayed as immature and whiny.

An earthquake and subsequent volcanic eruption separates Orion from his parents and siblings. Joe locates Orion and manages to rescue him, disappearing himself in the process, while Ōu soldier Sasuke gets separated from Rigel and others. With the Ōu Mountains in complete disarray, new threats arrive to exploit its weaknesses. Three sons of the Irish Wolfhound Kamakiri, a platoon leader for Hōgen, wish to avenge their father's death. Kurohabaki Masamune, the leader of the Kurohabaki Clan of ninja dogs, aims to take over Ōu and strengthen his army. He is the adoptive son of the former Kurohabaki leader, Terumune, and was previously denied leadership of the clan, despite his striving for approval. Instead, Terumune decided that his blood-related son Yamabiko, born after Masamune's arrival, would become leader. Thereafter, Masamune banished Terumune and took control of the clan. He holds a grudge against Yamabiko and plans to find and kill him. Meanwhile, members of the Kurohabaki clan roam Ōu, gathering recruits and killing those who resist.

=== Ginga: The Last Wars ===
Takahashi began publishing Ginga: The Last Wars (銀牙, THE LAST WARS) in 2015.

The series takes place six months after the end of Ginga Densetsu Weed: Orion. The dogs have been at peace, and all has seemingly gone well. However soon the monstrous bear Monsoon attacks, wanting to claim Futago Pass as his own. All the while getting vengeance for his father - Akakabuto who was killed by Gin during the events of Silver Fang -The Shooting Star Gin-.

Victory is not assured for the dogs, as an aging Gin has started to go blind. And the Supreme Commander Weed is severely injured by one of Monsoon's kin. Weed's children have been sent away for training, and are oblivious to the crisis at hand.

=== Ginga Densetsu Noah ===
Takahashi began publishing Ginga Densetsu Noah (銀牙伝説ノア) in 2019.

The series takes place few months after the events of Ginga: The Last Wars, Orion has gone missing to mourn the death of his brother, Sirius. A new army known as the Aka-Ari is making a name for themselves under the belief that the Ōu Army was killed by the bears.
