= Silver Fang =

Japanese manga and anime series

- Silver Fang: The Shooting Star Gin
- First tankōbon volume cover

銀牙 -流れ星 銀- (Ginga: Nagareboshi Gin)
- Manga
- Written by: Yoshihiro Takahashi
- Published by: Shueisha
- English publisher: NA: Manga Planet
- Imprint: Jump Comics
- Magazine: Weekly Shōnen Jump
- Original run: December 12, 1983 – March 23, 1987
- Volumes: 18
- Anime television series

Silver Fang
- Directed by: Tomoharu Katsumata
- Produced by: Morihiro Kato (TV Asahi)
- Written by: Mitsuru Majima; Kenji Terada
- Music by: Gorō Oumi
- Studio: Toei Animation
- Original network: ANN (TV Asahi)
- Original run: April 7, 1986 – September 22, 1986
- Episodes: 21
- Sequel
- Weed
- icon

Silver Fang: The Shooting Star Gin (Japanese: 銀牙 -流れ星 銀-, Hepburn: Ginga: Nagareboshi Gin) is a Japanese manga series written and illustrated by Yoshihiro Takahashi. It was published in Shueisha's shōnen manga magazine Weekly Shōnen Jump from 1983 to 1987, and collected in 18 bound volumes. The manga became digitally available in English through the Apple's iTunes App Store in 2011. It was licensed in North America in 2020 by Manga Planet.

The series tells the story of a young Akita Inu pup called Gin (Japanese for "silver") who leaves his master, a young boy named Daisuke, to join a pack of wild dogs. The pack is gathering strong dogs from all over Japan to fight a giant, monstrous, bloodthirsty and deranged Ussuri brown bear named Akakabuto (Japanese for "red helmet") and his entire army of bears. The story begins from the point of view of the humans, but swings to the dogs afterwards. Takahashi was reportedly inspired by a news article about hunting dogs that had been abandoned by their owners and had begun living as wild animals.

The manga was adapted as a 21-episode anime television series by Toei Animation, simply titled as Silver Fang, which aired on TV Asahi and its affiliates from April to September 1986.

It received the 1987 Shogakukan Manga Award for best shōnen series.

A sequel manga by Takahashi, titled Weed, was published from 1999 to 2009, with four other series following since.

== Plot ==
During the Autumn on 1983, a hunter named Takeda Gohei is famous for his bear hunting skills with his trained dog, Riki. A large bear given the name Akakabuto has been causing trouble in the mountains of Ou, killing humans, cattle and wild dogs. Gohei trains Riki's son, Gin, a silver striped Akita Inu, to be his next bear hunting dog after Akakabuto supposedly kills Riki. However, Gin meets a pack of wild dogs under the leadership of an amnesia suffering Riki, and leaves his owners to travel Japan with the pack to find other dogs and take down Akakabuto once and for all.

== Media ==
=== Manga ===
No.	Release date	ISBN
01	July 10, 1984	4-08-851481-5
01. "Birth of the Bear Hound Gin!" (熊犬銀誕生！, Kumainu Gin tanjou!); 02. "Riki's Death" (リキの最期！, Riki no saigo!); 03. "First Test" (最初の試練, Saishou no shiren)
02	October 9, 1984	4-08-851482-3
04. "White Rival" (白い強敵); 05. "Akakabuto's Stronghold is Unshakable" (赤カブトの牙城 揺がず); 06. "Their Bond" (ふたりの絆); 07. "Morning of Departure" (出陣の朝)
03	January 10, 1985	4-08-851483-1
08. "First Victory Full of Wounds" (傷だらけの初勝利！); 09. "Akakabuto's Army is Here!" (赤カブト軍団現る！); 10. "Souls That Call Out to One Another" (呼び合う魂); 11. "Meeting of the Two Heroes" (両雄 衝撃の出会い！)
04	April 10, 1985	4-08-851484-X
12. "Men, Take Off!" (男たち 旅へ！); 13. "Demon Dogs! The Kai Brothers" (魔犬・甲斐の三兄弟！); 14. "Leader of Kasumidake, Moss" (霞岳の首領・モス); 15. "Defeat the Treacherous!" (逆臣を討て！)
05	July 10, 1985	4-08-851485-8
16. "Bloody Battle! Six-Tree Peak!!" (血戦！六ッ木峠！！); 17. "Ben Died at the Six-Tree Peak?!" (ベン 六ッ峠に憤死！？); 18. "Beasts That Soars in the Air" (宙を舞う魔獣); 19. "The Appearance of Ninja Dog, Akame" (忍犬・赤目登場)
06	October 9, 1985	4-08-851486-6
20. "Ninja Art Ransuiryu" (忍法乱水流); 21. "The Battle at the Ninja Pond!" (決戦！忍沼); 22. "The Leader's Condition" (大将の条件)
07	January 10, 1986	4-08-851487-4
23. "Kurojaki's Final Moments!" (黒邪鬼の最期！); 24. "Aim For Musashi!" (武蔵を狙え！); 25. "Friends Don't Leave Friends Behind!" (朋友は見捨てぬ！)
08	April 10, 1986	4-08-851488-2
26. "Time To Bare One's Fangs!" (牙をむく瞬間！); 27. "Noble Decision" (崇高なる決断); 28. "The Legend of Umibozu" (海坊主の神話)
09	July 10, 1986	4-08-851489-0
29. "The Invincible Challenge!" (不屈の挑戦！); 30. "Rise Up, Man of Valor!" (勇者起つ！); 31. "The Oath to Supreme Commander Riki" (総大将 リキへの誓い)
10	September 10, 1986	4-08-851490-4
32. "Miraculous Wisdom" (驚異の智略); 33. "The Elites vs. The Four Heavenly Kings" (精鋭VS.四天王); 34. "Passionate Tears" (熱き血の涙)
11	December 5, 1986	4-08-851591-9
35. "The Time Has Come!" (時は満ちた！); 36. "The Thirteen Members of the Suicide Corps" (十三人の決死隊); 37. "Ben's Final Moments!?" (ベンの最期⁉)
12	February 10, 1987	4-08-851592-7
38. "A Fierce Fight and Fateful Showdown!" (激闘!!宿命の対決); 39. "A Blood-Covered Pond" (血ぬられた沼); 40. "The Phantom Beast!!" (幻の巨獣!!)
13	April 10, 1987	4-08-851593-5
41. "Breaking into The Stronghold for Battle" (牙城決戦突入); 42. "Father's Teachings" (父の教え)
14	June 10, 1987	4-08-851594-3
43. "A New Evil Power" (新たなる魔手); 44. "The Guidance of Sirius" (天狼星の導き)
15	August 10, 1987	4-08-851595-1
45. "A Painful Journey to Hell" (悶絶 地獄めぐり); 46. "The Strongest Man on Earth" (地上最強の男)
16	October 9, 1987	4-08-851596-X
47. "Legend of the Eight Warriors" (八犬士伝説); 48. "An Invitation From The Empire" (帝国よりの誘い)
17	January 8, 1988	4-08-851597-8
49. "The Eight Warriors of Darkness" (暗黒の八犬士); 50. "The Evil Commander in Chief" (悪の総帥)
18	April 8, 1988	4-08-851598-6
51. "The Champion's Power Awakens" (覇者に目覚めし力); 53. "The End of The Empire!?" (帝国崩壊⁉); 54. "Ou Is Waiting For Warrior" (戦士待つ奥羽); 55. "A Touching Reunion" (涙の再会)

=== Anime ===
The TV series was produced by TV Asahi and Toei Animation, with Tomoharu Katsumata serving as series director, Mitsuru Majima and Kenji Terada writing the scripts, Jōji Yanase designing the characters, and Gorō Oumi composing the music. It was broadcast every Monday from 19:30 to 20:00 (Japan Standard Time) on TV Asahi affiliate stations from April 7 to September 22, 1986, for a total of 21 episodes. The anime adaptation ended with the Akakabuto arc, and the Hakkenshi arc was not produced. In addition, the development of the last half of the story is simplified, with some dogs lacking any lines and their appearances reduced compared to the original manga. Takayuki Miyauchi performed both the opening and ending themes, "Nagareboshi Gin" and "TOMORROW".

No.	Title	Directed by	Written by	Original release date
1	"The Birth of Gin, a Little Hero!"; Transliteration: "Chiisana hīrō Gin no tanjō!" (Japanese: 小さなヒーロー銀の誕生!)	Tomoharu Katsumata	Mitsuru Majima	April 7, 1986
2	"Gin, Tomorrow Lies on the Other Side of Effort"; Transliteration: "Gin yo, doryoku no mukō ni ashita ga aru" (Japanese: 銀よ努力の向こうに明日がある)	Kazunori Tanahashi	Mitsuru Majima	April 14, 1986
3	"The Friendship of Gin, Who Risked His Life"; Transliteration: "Inochi o kaketa Gin no yūjō" (Japanese: 命を賭けた銀の友情)	Yūgo Serikawa	Mitsuru Majima	April 21, 1986
4	"The Challenge Of the Gigantic Bear Akakabuto!"; Transliteration: "Kyodai kuma Akakabuto e no chōsen!" (Japanese: 巨大熊赤カブトへの挑戦!)	Kazumasa Horikawa	Mitsuru Majima	April 28, 1986
5	"Heroic! A Triumph Covered in Scars"; Transliteration: "Sōzetsu! Kizu darake no shōri" (Japanese: 壮絶! 傷だらけの勝利)	Tomoharu Katsumata	Mitsuru Majima	May 5, 1986
6	"Howl! The Mountains are Calling"; Transliteration: "Hoero! Yama ga yondeiru" (Japanese: 吠えろ! 山が呼んでいる)	Kazunori Tanahashi	Mitsuru Majima	May 12, 1986
7	"Carve it Into Your Heart! A Male's Heated Oath"; Transliteration: "Mune ni kizame! Atsuki otoko no chikai" (Japanese: 胸に刻め! 熱き男の誓い)	Yūgo Serikawa	Mitsuru Majima	May 19, 1986
8	"Now! The Journey of Males"; Transliteration: "Ima! Otoko-tachi no tabidachi" (Japanese: 今! 男たちの旅立ち)	Kazumasa Horikawa	Kenji Terada	May 26, 1986
9	"Demon Dogs! Kai's Three Brothers!"; Transliteration: "Maken! Kai no Sankyōdai!" (Japanese: 魔犬! 甲斐の三兄弟)	Tomoharu Katsumata	Mitsuru Majima	June 2, 1986
10	"Monster! Moss's Soldiers of the Misty Peak"; Transliteration: "Kaibutsu! Kasumigaoka no Mosu gundan" (Japanese: 怪物! 霞岳のモス軍団)	Kazumasa Horikawa	Kenji Terada	June 9, 1986
11	"Ninja Dogs! The Black Shadow of Iga Village!"; Transliteration: "Ninken! Iga no sato ni kuroi kage" (Japanese: 忍犬! 伊賀の里に黒い影)	Kazumasa Horikawa	Kenji Terada	June 16, 1986
12	"Ben in Danger! The Confrontation in the Ninja Territory!"; Transliteration: "Ayaushi Ben! Ninja yashiki no taiketsu!!" (Japanese: 危うしベン! 忍者屋敷の対決!!)	Tomoharu Katsumata	Mitsuru Majima	June 23, 1986
13	"Justice! The Requirements of a Leader"; Transliteration: "Seigi! Rīdā e no jōken" (Japanese: 正義! リーダーへの条件)	Tomoharu Katsumata	Mitsuru Majima	June 30, 1986
14	"Advancing! The Small Young Commander"; Transliteration: "Susume! Chiisana wakadaishō" (Japanese: 進め! 小さな若大将)	Kazunori Tanahashi	Mitsuru Majima	July 7, 1986
15	"Benizakura! A Male Known as the Strongest on Earth!"; Transliteration: "Benizakura! Chijō saikyō to yobareru otoko!" (Japanese: 紅桜! 地上最強と呼ばれる男)	Tomoharu Katsumata	Kenji Terada	July 14, 1986
16	"Hot Tears! Overcoming the Death of a Companion"; Transliteration: "Atsuki Namida! Nakama no shi o norikoete" (Japanese: 熱き涙! 仲間の死をのりこえて)	Masayuki Akehi	Mitsuru Majima	July 21, 1986
17	"Now is the Time to Gather! To Serve Under the Supreme Commander!"; Transliteration: "Ima, shūketsu no toki! Sōdaishō no moto e!" (Japanese: 今、集結の時! 総大将のもとへ!!)	Kazumasa Horikawa	Kenji Terada	July 28, 1986
18	"Fight to the Death! The Time when a Male Abandons His Life!!"; Transliteration: "Shitō! Otoko ga inochi o suteru toki!!" (Japanese: 死闘! 男が命を捨てる時!!)	Tomoharu Katsumata	Mitsuru Majima	August 4, 1986
19	"Sorrow! The Last Moments of Benizakura, Who Bloomed in Crimson"; Transliteration: "Hisō! Shinku ni saita Benizakura no saigo" (Japanese: 悲愴! 真紅に咲いた紅桜の最期)	Masayuki Akehi	Mitsuru Majima	August 18, 1986
20	"Burn, Gin! Now Let Us See the Courage of a Male!"; Transliteration: "Moeyo Gin! Ima koso misero otoko no yūki!!" (Japanese: 燃えよ銀! 今こそ見せろ男の勇気!!)	Tomoharu Katsumata	Mitsuru Majima	September 8, 1986
21	"Gin! Embark on the Journey of a New Male!"; Transliteration: "Gin yo! Arata naru otoko no tabidachi e!!" (Japanese: 銀よ! 新たなる男の旅立ちへ!!)	Tomoharu Katsumata	Mitsuru Majima	September 22, 1986

== Reception ==
It received the 1987 Shogakukan Manga Award for best shōnen series. In Finland, the 1986 anime series has achieved a strong cult following.
