= Yoshihiro Takahashi =

Japanese manga artist

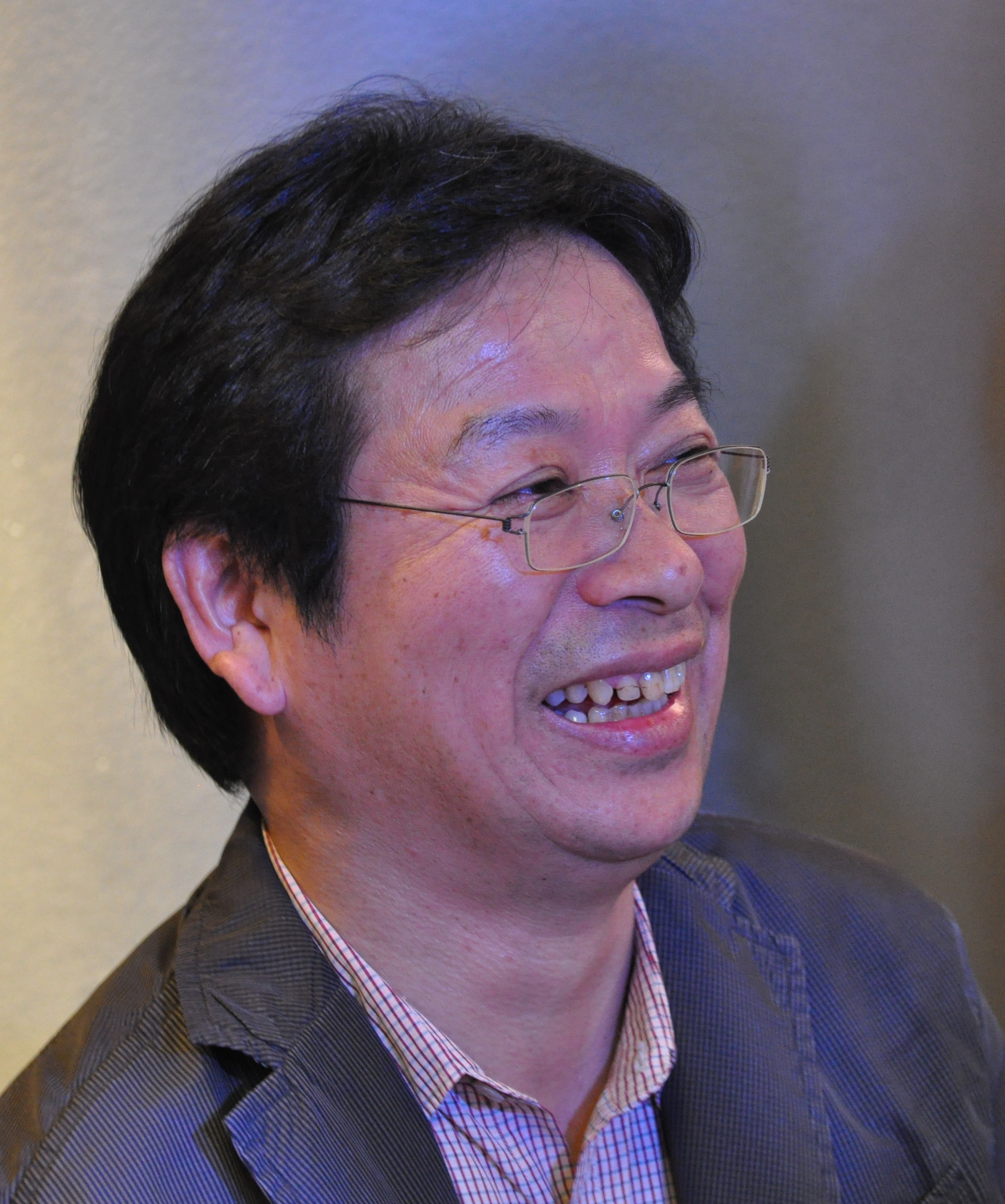
- Takahashi at the Suomalainen Kirjakauppa bookstore in Kamppi, Helsinki, Finland, 2011.
- Born: September 18, 1953 (age 73) Higashinaruse, Akita, Japan
- Area: Manga artist
- Notable works: Silver Fang; Weed
- Awards: Shogakukan Manga Award (1987); Tezuka Award

Yoshihiro Takahashi (高橋義廣, Takahashi Yoshihiro) is a Japanese manga artist. He writes under a pen name in which his first name Yoshihiro is spelled out in hiragana (よしひろ).

Takahashi was born on September 18th, 1953, in Higashinaruse, Akita, a village in the Tōhoku region of Japan. He was very interested in drawing coming of age-related themes and, in the 1960s, started publishing small comics in several newspapers and magazines. His first manga was Shitamachi Benkei, published in 1971, but his breakthrough came in 1984 when he published the popular manga Silver Fang, a story following a young Akita puppy, who goes in search of other dogs to fight the bear haunting his hometown. He got the idea in 1980, after reading an article about domestic dogs that ran away from their owners and lived as wild dogs in the mountains. The pure idea fascinated him, which eventually led him to create the aforementioned manga. In 1987, the series won the Shogakukan Manga Award for shōnen manga.

Takahashi started to publish Silver Fang's sequel, Weed, in 1999, and it soon became a hit as well, after the airing of the anime adaptation on September 17th, 2005. He has been touted as the first manga artist to draw manga featuring a puppy as the hero of the story.

Takahashi was the guest of honour at the Finnish role-playing and anime fan convention Tracon, which took place from the 3rd to the 4th of September, 2011, in Tampere. It was his first visit to Finland, and most likely his first time being a guest of honour outside Japan. He visited Finland for the second time in 2012, participating in the Animecon event in Kuopio. He also had a fan meeting, autograph sessions and interviews in Helsinki and Oulu. Third time he visited Finland in 2023, and his visit was organized by Yokote Masuda Manga Museum. He held autograph sessions from 15th to 19th September in Kamppi Center, Helsinki, and there was also an art exhibition of his works in Muji's Kamppi store. He visited Finland the fourth time in July 2025, as a guest of honour at the anime fan convention Animecon World in Jyväskylä.

== Bibliography ==
=== Manga ===
- Genkotsu Boy (げんこつボーイ) (1974)
- Akutare Kyojin (Giants) (悪たれ巨人 (ジャイアンツ)) (1976) Also known as Rowdyism Giant
- Shiroi Senshi Yamato (白い戦士ヤマト) (1978)
- Otoko no Tabidachi (男の旅立ち) (1981)
- Aozora Fishing (青空フィッシング) (1982)
- Tosaō (土佐王) (1982)
- Sho to Daichi (翔と大地) (1983)
- Silver Fang (銀牙流れ星銀) (1983) Also known as Ginga: Nagareboshi Gin
- Kacchū no Senshi Gamu (甲冑の戦士 雅武) (1988)
- Great Horse (グレートホース) (1990)
- Ama Kakeru Toki (天翔ける瞬間) (1991)
- Byakuren no Fangu (白蓮のファング) (1993)
- Takahashi Yoshihiro no Inu to Kurashitai (高橋よしひろのイヌと暮らしたい) (1994)
- Shōnen to Inu (少年と犬) (1994) Re-issued in 1996 under the name Ginga no Inutachi [Shōnen to Inu] Remix (銀牙の犬たち [少年と犬] リミックス)
- Kotō no Bōkensha (孤島の冒険者) (1995)
- Kyōko no Shura (恭子の修羅) (1995) Serialized in the Champion Jack manga magazine
- FANG (1998)
- Kandō Ō Retsuden 2 (感動王列伝 2) (1998)
- Ichi Geki (一撃) (1999)
- Weed (銀牙伝説ウィード) (1999) Also known as Ginga Densetsu Weed and Ginga Legend Weed
- Ginga Densetsu Riki (銀牙伝説リキ) (2000)
- Ginga Seiken Densetsu Meteor Gin (銀牙聖犬伝説 Meteor Gin) (2000) A databook of Silver Fang
- Lassie (ラッシー) (2001)
- Taishi – Haruka Naru Michi (大志 – 遥かなる道) (2001)
- Boku no Inu, Boku no Weed (ぼくの犬僕のウィード) (2001)
- Ginga Densetsu Weed Gaiden (銀牙伝説ウィード外伝) (2001)
- Drunk! (どらんく!) (2002)
- Ginga Densetsu Weed Gengashū (銀牙伝説ウィード 原画集) (2002) An artbook of Weed
- Ginga Densetsu Weed Meishōbu Retsuden (銀牙伝説ウィード - 名勝負列伝) (2003) A databook of Weed
- Ginga Nagareboshi Gin Shin Gaiden (銀牙流れ星銀 真・外伝) (2009)
- Ginga Densetsu Weed: Orion (銀牙伝説ウィードオリオン) (2009)
- Ginga Nagareboshi Gin Shin Gaiden 2 (銀牙ー流れ星銀ー真・外伝 2) (2010)
- Ginga Densetsu Anju to Jirōmaru (銀牙伝説 杏樹と次郎丸) (2011) Serialized in Bessatsu Manga Goraku
- Ginga Densetsu Akame (銀牙伝説 赤目) (2014-2015)
- Ginga: The Last Wars (銀牙〜THE LAST WARS〜) (2015-2019)
- Ginga Densetsu Noah (銀牙伝説ノア) (2019-2022)
- Densetsu Hozon No Sho Ginga Yondai (伝説保存ノ書 銀牙四代) (2019) A history and data book of four generations of bear dogs
- Giyū Isshin – Takahashi Yoshihiro Gagyō 50 Shūnen Kinenten – Tenjikai Zoroku (義勇一心 – 高橋よしひろ 画業50周年記念展 – 展示会図録) Takahashi's 50th anniversary commemorative exhibition catalog
- Ginga Shōnen Densetsu: Dog Days – Roku to Boku no Ichiban Atsukatta Hibi (銀牙少年伝説 ドッグデイズ─ロクとぼくの一番熱かった日々─) (2022-2023)
- Ginga Densetsu: Requiem (～銀牙伝説～レクイエム) (2024-present)

=== Short stories ===
- Ore no Alps (オレのアルプス) (1973) Published in the Weekly Shōnen Jump manga magazine
- Abare Jirō (あばれ次郎) (1974) Published in the Bessatsu Shōnen Jump manga magazine under the pen name Jun Takamiya
- BOXER (ボクサー) (1974) Published under the pen name Jun Takamiya
- Shitamachi Benkei (下町弁慶) (1971) Included as an extra story in Genkotsu Boy vol. 4
- Tosaō (土佐王) Included in a compilation book of the same name
- Revenger (リベンジャー) Included in the Tosaō story compilation
- Fires Funsensu (ファイヤーズ奮戦す) Included in the Tosaō story compilation
- Rō Ō (老王) Included in the Tosaō story compilation
- Wild Adventure (ワイルド アドベンチャー) (1982) Included in Aozora Fishing vol. 5
- Jaguar (ジャガー) (1987) Published in the Weekly Shōnen Jump Spring Special manga magazine
- Moon Kid (ムーンキッド) (1988) Included as an extra story in Shiroi Senshi Yamato's 1st publication's vol. 26 and in 2nd publication's vol. 14
- Aishi no Dino (愛しのディーノ) Included as an extra story in Kacchū no Senshi Gamu's first publication's vol. 2
- Hanako to Kurasu (花子と暮らす) Included in Takahashi Yoshihiro no Inu to Kurashitai
- Nagare Kenshi – Chizome No Seiken – (流れ拳士 – 血染めの正拳 –) Included as an extra story in Otoko no Tabidachi vol. 6
- Saraba! Kita no Ōkami (さらば ! 北の狼) Included as an extra story in Otoko no Tabidachi vol. 6
- Bear Hunter – Fubuki-gō (ベアハンター吹雪号) A story about Yamato's father Fubuki, included as an extra story in Ama Kakeru Toki vol. 2
- Hakugin no Teiō (白銀の帝王) A story about the characters of Shiroi Senshi Yamato, included as an extra story in Ama Kakeru Toki vol. 3
- Black Cobra (ブラック コブラ) Included as an extra story in Ama Kakeru Toki vol. 3
- Kubiwa – Shōnen to Inu (首輪–少年と犬) Included in the Shōnen to Inu story compilation
- Sensei no Inu (先生の犬) Included in the Shōnen to Inu story compilation
- Lead – Seinen to Inu (糸岡(リード) – 青年と犬) Included in the Shōnen to Inu story compilation
- Honō no Inu (炎の犬) Included in the Shōnen to Inu story compilation
- Obāsan no Inu (おばあさんの犬) Included in the Shōnen to Inu story compilation
- Amígo · Ken (アミーゴ · 犬) Included in the Shōnen to Inu story compilation
- Shiroi Yamainu (白い山犬) Included in the Shōnen to Inu story compilation and in Silver Fang 5th publication's vol. 6
- J. League no Kaze (Jリーグの風) soccer manga, other details unknown
- Goal! (ゴール!) soccer manga, other details unknown
- Furukawa Masaaki Monogatari – Kowareta Radio (古川昌明物語 – 壊れたラジオ–) (1994) Published in the Weekly Shōnen Sunday manga magazine
- Ashita e no Try (明日へのトライ) (1995) Rugby manga, published in the Weekly Shōnen Sunday manga magazine
- Kandō Ō Retsuden – Kawashima Hiroshi Monogatari (感動王列伝 – 川島郭志物語) (1996) Published in the Weekly Shōnen Sunday manga magazine
- Kandō Ō Retsuden – Harada Masahiko Monogatari (感動王列伝 – 原田雅彦物語) (1998) Published in the Weekly Shōnen Sunday manga magazine
- Kandō Ō Retsuden – Abe Norifumi Monogatari (感動王列伝 – 阿部典史物語) (1998) Published in the Weekly Shōnen Sunday manga magazine
- Alps Yamagoya Monogatari (アルプス山小屋物語) First of the stories in Kandō Ō Retsuden vol. 2
- Michiba Rokusaburō Monogatari (道場六三郎物語) Second of the stories in Kandō Ō Retsuden vol. 2
- VINTAGE HERO (1997) Published in the Auto Comic GT manga magazine
- Grand Slam (グランドスラム) (1999) A baseball manga, published in the Comic Gotta manga magazine
- Fureai Story – Yūta to Shiro (ふれあい ストーリー – ゆうたとシロ) Included in the book Boku no Inu, Boku no Weed
- Wagaya no Mer (我が家のメル) Included in the book Boku no Inu, Boku no Weed
- Yumemiru Senshitachi (夢見る戦士たち) Included in the Ginga Densetsu Weed Gaiden story compilation
- HANAKO Included in the Ginga Densetsu Weed Gaiden story compilation
- Lonely Ron (ロンリーロン) Two stories with the same name. The other is included in the Ginga Densetsu Weed Gaiden story compilation and the other in Ginga Nagareboshi Gin Shin Gaiden story compilation
- Shion no Kaze (シオンの疾風) Included in the Ginga Densetsu Weed Gaiden story compilation
- Mer no Tabidachi (メルの旅立ち) Included in the Ginga Densetsu Weed Gaiden story compilation
- Ganin (牙忍) Published in the Comic Jidai Katsugeki manga magazine
- Kai no san kyōdai (甲斐の三兄弟) Published in the Business Jump manga magazine and included in the Ginga Nagareboshi Gin Shin Gaiden story compilation
- Chōmon no Tabi (弔問の旅) Published in the Business Jump manga magazine and included in the Ginga Nagareboshi Gin Shin Gaiden story compilation
- Karadaki no Tomon (枯滝の十文) Published in the Business Jump manga magazine and included in the Ginga Nagareboshi Gin Shin Gaiden vol. 2 story compilation
- Shin Gaiden Benizakura Hen (真外伝紅桜編) Published in the Business Jump manga magazine and included in the Ginga Nagareboshi Gin Shin Gaiden vol. 2 story compilation
- Namonaki Inu no Uta (名も無き犬の詩 or 名もなき犬の詩) Published in the Business Jump manga magazine, dedicated to the Finnish Ginga fans
