= Nihon Ken Hozonkai =

Association for the Preservation of the Japanese Dog

Nihon Ken Hozonkai The Association for the Preservation of the Japanese Dog
- Abbreviation: Nippo
- Formation: March 10, 1937; 89 years ago
- Purpose: Preservation and maintenance of the registries for the six native Japanese dog breeds
- Headquarters: Tokyo
- Location(s): F1 Surugadai-Sanraizu Bldg. 2-11-1, Kanda-Suruga-Dai, Chiyoda-ku, Tokyo 101-0062 Japan 〒101-0062 東京都千代田区神田駿河台2-11-1 駿河台サンライズビル1F
- Coordinates: 35°42′2″N 139°45′31″E
- Region served: Japan
- Official language: Japanese
- Parent organization: Ministry of Education, Culture, Sports, Science and Technology
- Website: www.nihonken-hozonkai.or.jp

The Nihon Ken Hozonkai (日本犬保存会, The Association for the Preservation of the Japanese Dog), commonly abbreviated to Nippo, is a preserver and maintainer of the registries for the six native Japanese dog breeds: the Akita Inu, Hokkaido, Kai Ken, Kishu, Shikoku, and Shiba Inu. Nippo also issues the Nippo Standard, which serves as a breed standard for the six native breeds.

== History ==
Nippo was founded in May 1928 by Dr. Hirokichi Saito, who served as the group's first president, and formally named in 1932. Saito was a key person in making the faithful dog (or loyal dog) Hachikō famous. With the support of Nippo, the Akita Inu was designated as a national monument in 1931, and the Shiba Inu in 1936. Nippo was formally recognized by the Japanese government in 1937. Nippo's first national show was held in Tokyo on November 6, 1932.

The group celebrated its 60th anniversary in 1988, and in 1992 had roughly 16,000 members with annual registrations of 60,000 dogs. Nippo currently holds one national show in the fall, and regional shows each fall and spring.

== See also ==
- Japan Kennel Club
- Japanese Dog
