= List of Silver Fang characters =

The fictional characters from the manga and anime series Silver Fang and Weed, Ginga: The Last Wars and Ginga Densetsu Noah were created by Yoshihiro Takahashi.

== Silver Fang ==
=== Gin ===
Voiced by: Eiko Yamada (GNG) and Hiroki Tōchi (GDW)

Gin (銀 Silver) (Bear hunting dog): The main protagonist. A tiger-striped (tora-ge), or silver brindle Akita Inu pup. He is the pup that ultimately leads the final battle against Akakabuto. Gin is courageous and loyal, if a little headstrong. He is quick to anger when lives are taken needlessly, which initially sets him at odds with John. After Riki is killed by Akakabuto in the final battle, Gin let loose the Zetsu Tenrou Battouga (絶天狼抜刀牙, roughly: "Wielding the Absolute Fang of Heaven's Wolf"), the attack of a wolf, slicing Akakabuto's head clean off. As his father died the way all leaders expected, Gin stood on the top of Gajou and howled for the respect of the dead. The anime ends here. The manga continues with Gin teaming up with a pack of wolves to defeat their deadly enemy, Gaia; becoming the Zetsu Tenrou Battouga Hakkenshi warrior.

=== Riki ===
Voiced by: Banjō Ginga (GNG)

Riki (リキ, literally "Strength"): (Akita Inu) Gin's charismatic father. He was believed killed in the beginning of the series by Akakabuto when he threw Riki off a cliff, but survived and had amnesia, becoming the leader of a pack of wild dogs. He was killed in the final battle by Akakabuto, when the bear slashed him open with his claws, but not before regaining his memories. In the manga it is revealed that he learned the Zetsu Tenrou Battouga from a wolf Hakkenshi (八犬士, Eight Canine Warriors) named Fuuga, and upon his death, warns Gin never to use it again, because he fears the wolves will come after him (this does not happen in the anime).

=== Fuji ===
Voiced by: Yukiko Riwa

Fuji (富士, literally "Peerless"): (Akita Inu) Gin's mother. Though she plays a small role, she is shown to be caring and protective of her pups. It is said that she used to be a hunting dog, but once she got pregnant with Gin and his siblings, she had to retire to take care of her puppies.

=== Shiro ===
Shiro (シロ, literally "White"): (Akita Inu) Gin's grandfather and Riki's father. He was killed by Akakabuto, and appears only in the beginning of the first episode, though he had a larger role in the side-story: Ginga Densetsu Riki.

=== Gin's Siblings ===
Gin's siblings
(Akita Inus) They are looked upon as bad hunting dogs by Gohee, due to their lack of aggression, and he refuses to train them as he does Gin. They are seen briefly in the first few episodes of the anime, but have no other importance. They're incorrectly known as "Hiya-n" (ヒャーン) and "Giyan" (ギャン) but these are just the whimpering noises the pups made when Gohee hit them with his cane. In Ginga Densetsu Anju To Jirōmaru, it's mentioned that one of them is the parent of Yuki and the grandfather of her children; Jirōmaru, Tarōmaru, Saburōmaru and Koyuki. In Ginga: The Last Wars, it is revealed that one of them is grandfather of Shion & his eight unnamed siblings and the father of Kinumaru.

=== Ben ===
Voiced by: Hideyuki Tanaka (GNG) and Katsuhisa Hōki (GDW)

Ben (ベン): A Great Dane. He was one of Riki's platoon leaders. He possesses unusual strength and recuperative ability. He was blinded by poison in a trap set by Akame, who was led to believe that Ben's group were outsiders helping Kurojaki. He then turned his platoon over to Gin. Although he was blind, he risked his life for the pack during the great battle between Akakabuto and their army of dogs. In the manga, he later becomes the Geki Sentsuuhi Battōga (撃閃通抜刀牙) Hakkenshi warrior.

=== Cross ===
Voiced by: Toshiko Fujita (GNG) and Keiko Mizutani (GDW)

Cross (クロス, Kurosu): A Saluki. A strong fighter in her own right, she was left for dead by her master after an attack by Akakabuto killed the rest of his hunting dogs. She joined the pack, and eventually fell in love with Ben, becoming his mate. She is the only female to have been accepted into a platoon. She has three pups: Ken, George and Minnie. Ken plays an important role in Silver Fang -The Shooting Star Gin-.

=== John ===
Voiced by: Hideyuki Hori (GNG) and Tōru Ōkawa (GDW)

John (ジョン, Jon): A German Shepherd. He was Hidetoshi's hunting dog, but joined the wild dogs after losing a fight for leadership with Riki. At first reluctant to trust anyone, he eventually becomes close to Gin. John is notoriously snobbish and rude, but his fight with Riki seems to give him a much-needed dose of reality.

=== Moss ===
Voiced by: Daisuke Gōri (GNG) and Shirō Saitō (GDW)

Moss (モス, Mosu): An English Mastiff. The leader of the Misty Mountains wild dogs. Sniper tried to turn Moss against Ben by killing one of his subordinates, Lloyd, and attempting to murder Moss' son, Jaguar, and frame Ben for the killings. Initially this ploy worked, and Moss and his pack fought fiercely against Ben's, nearly killing Ben in the process. When facts were eventually set straight, Moss joined Ben's pack, and proved to be a valuable ally in the final battle. Moss has a rather strange sense of humor, and in the manga is frequently seen horsing around with Smith. His also shown to have great affection for pups, being a very gentle and caring father figure.

=== Sniper ===
Voiced by: Kōji Yada

Sniper (スナイパー, Sunaipā): A Doberman. Once Riki's second-in-command, he sees Ben and Gin as a threat to his authority. After several attempts to sabotage Ben's mission, he is thrown out of the pack after losing a fight with Gin. Trying to break up the pack before the battle with Akakabuto, he was drowned in a ravine by Ben. In the manga, he survives this encounter and goes on to be an enemy of Gin's son, Weed.

=== Hyena ===
Voiced by: Shigeharu Matsuda

Hyena (ハイエナ, Haiena): A Weimaraner mix. Sniper's cowardly lieutenant. Hyena eventually joins back up with the rest of the pack, and betrays Sniper. Hyena commits suicide trying to save Ben from Sniper. In the anime, he fell off the sheer cliff and ultimately met his end. In the manga, he survives the fall, but ends up being killed by Sniper after protecting Ben. In Ginga Densetsu Noah, it's revealed that he had amnesia and change his name to Noah after found by his new owner.

=== Smith ===
Voiced by: Kyōko Tongū (GNG) and Ryūsei Nakao (GDW)

Smith (スミス, Sumisu): A French Spaniel mix. Another of Riki's platoon leaders, he is saved by Gin after one of Sniper's plots, and they become friends. Easy going, but still serious, he is referred to as a "girl-chaser" by Cross. He also led Gohee to the final battle with Akakabuto.

=== Akatora, Chūtora and Kurotora ===
Voiced by: Kōji Totani (Akatora), Kōzō Shioya (Chutora), Ryōichi Tanaka (GNG) and Tadashi Miyazawa (GDW) (Kurotora)

Akatora, Chūtora and Kurotora (赤虎, 中虎, 黒虎): The Kai Ken brothers. As pups, the three were saved by Ben from a marten, but not before Kurotora's left eye was blinded. Akatora ("Red tiger"), the oldest of the three, is killed in the final battle; he sacrificed himself to take out Akakabuto's left eye, leaving the bear totally blind. Originally, his intentions in this attack were simply to save the life of Ben. Chūtora ("Middle tiger") is the one who is missing his right ear. He receives little to no serious recognition and later dies in the time period between Silver Fang -The Shooting Star Gin- and Weed. Kurotora ("Black tiger"), the youngest, lost an eye in the aforementioned attack. Later in the manga, Kurotora becomes the Ran Daryuushin Battouga (乱蛇龍身抜刀牙) Hakkenshi warrior. Kurotora and Chūtora's sons(Kagetora, Harutora, Nobutora, Shigure, Shouji, Buro and Dodo), born after the series, play important parts in Weed.

=== Akame ===
Voiced by: Michihiro Ikemizu (GNG) and Takashi Matsuyama (GDW)

Akame (赤目, literally "Red Eyes"): A Kishū Inu. He is the leader of the Iga Ninja Dogs. Ben first met Akame when he was still a hunting dog, his owner believed that Akame was a flying squirrel and shot him, wounding his leg. When he realized his mistake, the human brought Akame to his home and treated his injuries. After his wounds heal, Akame pleaded to Ben to let him out of his cage, as his pups were still too young to survive on their own. Ben relents, and Akame returned to the forest to lead the Ninja dogs.

Years later, after falling for Kurojaki's scheme, Akame poisons Ben and his group. Later realizing Kurojaki's treachery, Akame is devastated and, with Gin's help, brings Ben and his dogs the medicinal herbs that will cure the poison. Though they save the packs lives, Ben is left with permanently impaired vision. After a battle against Kurojaki and the other Kogas, ending in Kurojaki's suicide, Akame joins Ben in his mission and they leave for Shikoku. In the manga, he later becomes the Shuu Tossou Battouga (襲突槍抜刀牙) Hakkenshi warrior.

=== Kurojaki ===
Voiced by: Kōji Nakata

Kurojaki (黒邪鬼, literally "Black Devil"): An unknown mix of breeds, slightly resembling a spotted hyena. He is the leader of the Kōga Ninja Dogs. He has the distinction of being the only dog to actively use a weapon - a kama, which is eventually used against him by Gin, gouging out his own eye. When Akame burns the Iga house to end the feud, Kurojaki flings himself into the fire, declaring that the war is his only purpose. Most of the other Kōgas follow, and are burned to death.

Kurojaki's son is adopted by the pack, who give him the affectionate title of 'Chibi' (チビ), and Cross helps raise him until her pups with Ben are born. Later he is officially named Tesshin, and plays an important role in Silver Fang -The Shooting Star Gin-.

=== Wilson ===
Voiced by: Kōichi Hashimoto

Wilson (ウィルソン, Wiruson): A Rough Collie. He was once a circus dog that traveled all of Japan. His mate Leen and pup Londo were killed by Kurojaki, which drives Wilson into attempting to kill Kurojaki's son in revenge. He was stopped by Cross, and after that he joined Ben's pack. Wilson knows many stories, and his knowledge often comes in handy.

=== Musashi ===
Voiced by: Kazuhiko Kishino (GNG) and Shigenori Sōya (GDW)

Musashi (武蔵): A Tosa Inu. Once a champion fighting dog, he also joined Ben's group, and led Gin to Benizakura.

=== Benizakura ===
Voiced by: Takeshi Aono

Benizakura (紅桜, literally "Crimson Cherry Blossom"): A Tosa Inu/Presa Canario mix. Benizakura is seen defeating a bull when Gin first meets him. Gin attacks Benizakura, letting him strike twice, so that he later can demand a re-match. Benizakura's owner finds Cross passed-out on the beach, and brings Cross to Benizakura. Cross tells Benizakura about the pack and their goal. Gin returns and challenges Benizakura to a fight, and makes him promise that if Gin dies Benizakura will take over as leader of the pack. Benizakura agrees and the fight starts. Benizakura defeats Gin, pinning him down to the ground, but is still impressed by Gin's fighting spirit, and he then decides to join the pack. Benizakura sacrificed himself to ensure the death of Mosa, one of Akakabuto's lieutenants. (Benizakura is sometimes romanized into Benisakura, but this is inaccurate.)

=== Kisaragi ===
Voiced by: Show Hayami

Kisaragi (如月): A Siberian Husky. He is an ambitious pack leader, and fights with Gin's pack before the two ally against Akakabuto. He and three other generals prowl Mutsu; Uzuki, Hazuki, and Minazuki rarely get any special attention.

=== Hakurō ===
Voiced by: Ryōichi Tanaka

Hakurō (白狼): A Siberian Husky. He traveled all the way from Hokkaido to join the battle against Akakabuto. He has a quirky sense of humor and is prone to acting quite brashly. In the manga, he loses a leg to wolves.

=== Bill ===
Voiced by: Hidekatsu Shibata

Bill (ビル, Biru): A Doberman, leader of the Bandit dogs and apparently a righteous dog, since he stops Sniper from fighting unfairly against Gin and his friends. After Gin has convinced him with his skills Bill and the Bandits join the Ōu soldiers in the war against Akakabuto. In the manga, he is killed by wolves.

==== Great ====
Voiced by: Yusaku Yara

Great (グレート, Gurēto): A Great Dane. He is one of the platoon commanders, and convinces Bemu to join his pack when he lays down in front of an incoming train, demonstrating his lack of fear of death. Bemu saves Great and afterwards, Bemu joins the pack.

==== Oliver ====
Voiced by: Masashi Hironaka

Oliver (オリバー, Oribā): A Dachshund, and a friend of Cross. He rescued her when she was cornered by the two rogue dogs Rokusuke and Beth while she was on her way to Shikoku, and later returns to aid her and Gin. Oliver is very perky and streetwise, and frequently jokes about his own stubby legs. In the wolf arc, he digs open a passage to the wolves domain, for the other dogs to follow after Gin.

==== Kirikaze ====
Voiced by: Masaharu Satō

Kirikaze (霧風): A Kishū Inu Iga ninja dog. He is one of Akame's followers, When he and Jinnai tried to attack Madara from above with the 'Raikaken' attack, Jinnai jumped right in Madara's mouth. Enraged, Kirikaze leaps at Madara, and Madara fatally injures him with a single blow. When Gin and the others are thinking there is no way to defeat Madara, Kirikaze tells them to use a kama, like Kurojaki used. Instead of using a kama, Gin and Akame used massive, sharp tree branch. When Madara is killed, Kirikaze dies peacefully.

==== Jinnai ====
Voiced by: Michitaka Kobayashi

Jinnai (陣内): A Kishū Inu. He is an Iga ninja dog and one of Akame's followers. During the battle with Madara, a failed Raikaken attack lands Jinnai straight into Madara's jaws, where he is killed instantly.

==== Hayato ====
Voiced by: Hideyoshi Ōtani
Hayato (早士)
A Kishū Inu and Iga ninja dog. When the Kōga ninjas first attack, he was very scared. His brother gave him courage and inspired him by drowning himself with a Kōga, and Hayato plunges into a hole filled with pikes with another Kōga, thus sacrificing himself.

==== Rikiō ====
Rikiō (力王)
A Tosa Inu. He once belonged to Gohee and was trained as a hunting dog, renowned for eating bear-meat the first time it was offered to him. His head was crushed under the paw of a bear, for Rikiou rushed the bear, having never learned to fear the powerful enemy.

==== Tsuna'arashi ====
Tsuna'arashi (綱嵐)
A Tosa Inu. He was once the fighting dog champion of all of Japan, but not long after fighting and drawing with Benizakura, he went blind and was abused as a training dog for other fighters. When Benizakura wished to have a rematch with him, Tsuna'arashi was discovered in his pathetic state, and Benizakura killed the dogs beating him before running away.

=== Bears ===
Akakabuto (赤カブト)
A gigantic, legendary, monstrous, one-eyed ussuri brown bear and the main antagonist. Also known as the notorious Onikubi, or "demon bear", in Iwate and Aomori. Akakabuto's name means "red helmet", named after the red mane running down his back. He has terrorized the humans and dogs of the Ōu Mountains for years. His right eye is blind after it was shot out by Gohee six years ago. Because of the damage, Akakabuto is unable go into hibernation and grows to an unimaginable size, but also made him unpredictably unhinged, violent, mindless and bloodthirsty. Gin finally slays him during the final battle between the dogs and the bears, decapitating Akakabuto with the Zetsu Tenrou Battouga attack. In the English Silver Fang -The Shooting Star Gin- manga, he is actually called "Red Helmet".
Madara (マダラ)
A scarred Asian black bear and one of Akakabuto's main lieutenants. Early in the anime, Madara was just one of the many nuisance bears of the Ōu Mountains, and challenged the pack many times. He has many white markings across his body, hence his name; madara means "spots" in Japanese. He challenged Akakabuto early in the series, but lost with a single blow. When Akakabuto gathered bears against the dogs, however, Madara was one of his lieutenants. He was killed by Gin and Akame when Gin fashioned a spear with a large branch and rammed it through his mouth, impaling Madara through the back of the neck and resulting in him dying from blood loss. While some European dubs describe Madara as a female, in the original Japanese version, however, Madara is male.
Mosa (モサ)
A grizzly bear and one of Akakabuto's main lieutenants, although his right front leg is deformed and vestigial. Nevertheless, Mosa is very swift and intelligent. He was killed in an attack by Benizakura, who tied him down underwater in a river, causing both of them to drown.
Gaki (牙鬼)
Another son of Akakabuto. He was his father's duplicate used to fool Akakabuto's enemies. Riki cut his claws off, believing him to be Akakabuto, but is weakened after using the attack and Gaki strikes.
"Harpoon Bear"
A serial killing brown bear with three harpoons lodged into his back. When the dogs are about to cross the sea, Wilson tells the tale pertaining to why the ship they take refuge on is deserted; the bear was trapped on the ship and began to slaughter the crew. Eventually, the survivors of the crew discovered him and drove three harpoons into his back, but it didn't seem to kill the bear. He makes his way to Ōu and kills one of Akakabuto's lieutenants, Kesagake, thus taking his place. He tries to impress Akakabuto by leading Gin's pack towards Gajou, but Akakabuto is infuriated with him betraying the location of the stronghold, and knocks the Harpoon Bear off the rocky top of Gajou to his death by killing him with a powerful slash of his claws.
Kesagake (ケサガケ)
An asian black bear and one of Akakabuto's lieutenants. He is charged with guarding the paths to Gajou, but is killed by the harpooned bear. Kesagake is probably a reference to the Sankebetsu brown bear incident.

=== Humans ===
==== Gohee Takeda ====
Voiced by: Takeshi Watabe

Gohee Takeda (竹田 五兵衛, Takeda Gohee): A gruff and violent-tempered old bear hunter in the Ōu Mountains. The village "grandfather," he is 64 years old during the events of GNG. Five years previous, he lost his dog, Shiro, (Gin's grandfather) to Akakabuto, and also got his left ear sliced off by the demon bear. He trains Gin, and is his owner part of the time. In the end of the manga, Gohee falls ill, and he reunites with Gin and Riki for the last time before dying. As he is carried off in a car, Gin's pack, which were on both sides of the road, howl in Gohee's honor for giving them such a great leader.

==== Daisuke Fujiwara ====
Voiced by: Chika Sakamoto

Daisuke (大輔): Gin's original owner, before Gohee took him. Gin is returned to him after Gohee is hospitalized. Daisuke is 12 years old, and the son of a local ski lodge owner. Very brash and often bratty, Daisuke swears to kill Akakabuto with Gin's help.

==== Hidetoshi Sekiguchi ====
Voiced by: Hirotaka Suzuoki

Hidetoshi (秀俊): The arrogant son of a local mayor that was killed by Akakabuto. He was John's owner. He, along with his hunting dog, John, killed one of Akakabuto's ferocious cubs, mistaking it for Akakabuto himself, in revenge for his father. He is a surgeon who has returned to the town after many years and maintains a private hospital. He is an experienced hunter who teaches Daisuke how to handle a hunting bow.

=== Reima's soldiers ===
Reima (霊魔)
The leader of a clan of wolves hiding in Mount Fuji. When Reima and his soldiers hear word of Gin being able to use the Zetsu Tenrou Battouga, they set out to kidnap Cross and her puppies in order to lure him to them. They tell Gin the story of how the Zetsu Tenrou Battouga is one of eight special techniques passed down through their bloodline, known as the Hakkenshi (八犬士, Eight Canine Warriors); so named because only one wolf is born for each technique at a time. As a puppy, Reima's parents were killed by their rival clan, and now he has sworn revenge against that clans' evil inheritor: Gaia. During the final battle, Reima loses his leg to Gaia, but manages to kill him by trapping them both in a landslide.

Reima is the adoptive father of Hyouma.

Retsuga (烈牙)
Retsuga is the wolf who is sent to kidnap Cross, and is a member of the Hakkenshi. He is first at odds with Gin, because he believes that the wolves should take revenge against humans, due to being eradicated to (supposed) extinction. Eventually he gives up this goal to focus entirely on fighting Gaia's pack. Retsuga wields the Retsu Genmu Battouga (烈幻夢抜刀牙), but can also summon tornadoes at will. These make it easier for him to travel long distances, as well as helping in battle.

Retsuga is the son of Fuuga, whom he blamed for his mother's death and abandoning him. However, this hatred dissolves after Noroi's treachery is revealed, and he finds out that Noroi is the one who killed his mother. He joins Gin's pack at the end of the manga, but is never mentioned in Silver Fang -The Shooting Star Gin-

Hyōma (氷魔)
Hyouma is the son of Reima, and a member of the Hakkenshi. In addition to his signature move, the Metsu Hen'i Battouga (滅変異抜刀牙), he can also summon thick mists to confound his opponent. He fights Gin when they first meet, because he does not want to accept that a dog could be a member of the Hakkenshi. However, he is defeated, and later comes to accept Gin as a friend and ally. During his fight against Gold Eye, one of Gaia's "Black Hakkenshi", Reima reveals that he is not Hyouma's real father.

He joins Gin's pack at the end of the manga, but is likewise never mentioned in Silver Fang -The Shooting Star Gin-.

Fuuga (風牙)
Fuuga was the original "Zetsu" Hakkenshi warrior, but was labeled a traitor by Noroi after expressing his desire to leave humans alone. He left the pack and was pursued by Noroi's soldiers, where he was later saved from them by Gin's father, Riki. In gratitude, Fuuga taught Riki the Zetsu Tenrou Battouga (絶天狼抜刀牙), which is the strongest of the eight Battougas. This is ultimately how Gin comes to be in possession of the attack. Fuuga later shows up at Gajou (the stronghold the dogs reclaimed from Akakabuto) looking for Riki, where he is told of Gin's involvement with his former pack, by Smith. When he arrives back in Reima's territory, he stops Hyouma and Noroi's troops from fighting John and the others. Knowing Noroi is a traitor, he tries to kill him, but is stopped by his son, Retsuga. Noroi orders Retsuga to fight his father, but Suiga intervenes, having witnessed the murder of Retsuga's mother, and revealing it to him. With Noroi's betrayal revealed, Fuuga is able to rejoin the fight against Gaia's clan.

He is killed in the fight against Juuga; sacrificing himself to resurrect Gin, because of a legend that only one living warrior of Zetsu can exist at a time.

Suiga (水牙)
Suiga is one of Reima's gatekeepers. He resides in a large water cave, that must be passed through to enter Reima's domain inside Mount Fuji, and as such possesses large, webbed paws for swimming. He fights Gin with his Sai Raijin Battouga (砕雷針抜刀牙), and ability to create vicious whirlpools. However, he spares him after seeing him use the Zetsu Tenrou Battouga. Suiga knew about Noroi's killing of Retsuga's mother, and reveals the truth to him before he can fight his own father to the death over it. Suiga is killed by Gaia's soldiers, who pull him into a river of lava.
Mukonga (武痕牙)
The final, and greatest of Reima's gatekeepers, Mukonga is a giant wolf who can cast illusions over his subordinates, making them look like floating skulls. After quickly defeating Gin and Akame, he fights Ben with his Geki Sentsuuhi Battouga (撃閃通抜刀牙). Ben figures out how to see through this attack, and use it, and is able to defeat him. Respecting them as warriors, and recognizing them as allies, Mukonga allows them to pass. Later however, the hideout is infiltrated by Gaia's wolves, and Mukonga is killed defending it from Thunder Wolf, whom he also manages to kill. This marks Ben as the new warrior of 'Geki'.
Hyakkiga (百鬼牙)
Hyakkiga is adorned with a serpent mask, and special armor with spikes steeped in poison. He fights Kurotora with his Ran Daryuushin Battouga (乱蛇龍身抜刀牙) and ability to camouflage himself in his environment. He is defeated by the Kai Ken, who is able to imitate his attack due to having killed a snake in his youth. Hyakkiga is then killed by Noroi with a bamboo spear for his failure. His dying wish is to see what's beyond Reima's territory, which Retsuga grants, using his tornadoes. This leaves Kurotora as the new warrior of 'Ran'.
Shuuga (襲牙)
Shuuga is another one of Reima's gatekeepers, and resides in a secluded bamboo grove. Unlike his fellow Hakkenshi soldiers, Shuuga is quite bloodthirsty, possessing an ever-growing 'collection' of dogs he's impaled on his sharpened bamboo stalks. He targets Akame, because he doesn't have a white dog in his 'collection', yet. The two proceed to battle, and Shuuga tries to stab him with the exposed bone on his foreleg, which has been sharpened to allow him to perform his Shuu Tossou Battouga (襲突槍抜刀牙) more effectively. When Shuuga is about to be defeated by Akame, he chooses to become part of his own 'collection' and maneuvers them so that he will die on one of his sharpened bamboo stalks. This makes Akame the new warrior of 'Shuu'.
Raiga (雷牙)
Raiga is a special being; able to use his Zan Hishoubunshin Battouga (斬飛翔分身抜刀牙) to call forth two clones, or "brothers", to fight beside him. He first attacks Kurotora at the entrance to Reima's domain, believing him to be an intruder. Kurotora fights him while Gin, Ben, and Akame enter the lair, and is almost killed before John and the others arrive with Retsuga and Fuuga, who tell Raiga what's going on. Raiga and his two "brothers" are killed by beheading, while protecting Gin from Gaia.
Noroi (呪)
Noroi is the teacher of Reima's Hakkenshi, and brother to his counterpart, Juuga. Noroi killed Fuuga's mate, Retsuga's mother, after he left, and has been secretly leaking information to the enemy. However, when one of the enemies, Mugen, attacks him and leaves him for dead after one such excursion, he rethinks his position. In the end, he saves Gin by jumping into Thousand Dragon's trap before him, getting torn apart by his 999 soldiers. Before he dies, he admits to them that he had been leaking information to the enemy, and was the one who revealed the location of Reima's hideout to them.

=== Gaia's soldiers ===
Gaia (ガイア)
Gaia is the leader of the clan of the so-called "Underworld", and resides with his Japanese wolves in Hokkaido. His ancestors killed Reima's parents and stole the Underworld from them. Gaia fights against Reima's pack, killing all but a few of them with no signs of succumbing to their attacks. Reima is finally able to kill him by crushing the two of them in a huge landslide.
Black Snake (ブラックスネーク)
Black Snake is the most powerful of Gaia's "Black Hakkenshi", possessing the Zetsu Tenrou Battouga. He fights Gin and is badly wounded before being saved by Juuga.
Gold Eye (ゴールドアイ)
Gold Eye is a member of the "Black Hakkenshi" and wields the Metsu Hen'i Battouga. He also possesses special eyes, which render Hyouma's mist useless. He is killed fighting Hyouma, who tricks him into getting blood on him, which Hyouma uses to follow his scent and counter his ambush attacks. During the fight, Gold Eye mentions that he and Hyouma may be brothers.
White Tiger (ホワイトタイガー)
White Tiger is the Shuu Tossou Battouga "Black Hakkenshi", and so fights Akame. Before the battle, White Tiger reveals that he has both Kishū Inu and Kōga Ninja Dog blood in his veins. He utilizes natural hot spring geysers in his battle, to hide and sit on top of them, out of reach. Akame is finally able to defeat him after using an Iga Ninja "waterwheel"-type move to climb the geysers, where they both stab each other with the Shuu Tossou Battouga. White Tiger is killed, while Akame is not, and he reveals it was because the waterwheel move caused him to be in a position for White Tiger to miss stabbing a vital area.
Big Horn (ビッグホーン)
Big Horn is the "Black Hakkenshi" of Geki Sentsuuhi Battouga. He fights Ben but is killed easily, due to Ben having a better reach.
Mountain Bison (マウンテンバイソン)
One of the "Black Hakkenshi", but we don't get to know which one, due to the fight being stopped by Juuga.
Pink Dragon (ピンクドラゴン)
One of the "Black Hakkenshi", but we don't get to know which one, due to the fight being stopped by Juuga.
Bob Cat (ボブキャット)
One of the "Black Hakkenshi", but we don't get to know which one, due to the fight being stopped by Juuga.
Red Bull (レッドブル)
One of the "Black Hakkenshi", but we don't get to know which one, due to the fight being stopped by Juuga.
Thousand Dragon (千竜牙)
A wolf with 999 followers, who band together to form a giant wolf head. Though it appears to be made of stone, it is in fact, solid wolves. Thousand Dragon uses this trick to fool Gin and the others into thinking the wolf head is the entrance to Gaia's domain. When Gin tries to enter, Noroi sacrifices himself to leap inside ahead of him, and show them it's a trap. He is torn apart, and the others realize that the 'cave' is in fact made of wolves, saving them. Retsuga uses his tornadoes to blow away the 999 soldiers, but Thousand Dragon is able to abduct Reima and escape to the Underworld, knowing they will follow.
Mugen (夢幻)
Mugen was the wolf that Noroi was reporting to, and also the one who tried to kill him once he became useless. Using the information Noroi provided him, Mugen infiltrated Reima's hideout with his elite squad of "Ten Demon Wolves". However, his soldiers were defeated by the Hakkenshi, causing him to flee and never be heard from again.
Thunder Wolf (サンダーウルフ)
One of Mugen's elite "Ten Demon Wolves", he fought Mukonga for entrance to Reima's hideout, where they killed each other.
Juuga (呪牙)
The teacher of Gaia's "Black Hakkenshi" and older brother to his counterpart, Noroi. He interrupts the fight between the Hakkenshi and the "Black Hakkenshi" before Gin can kill Black Snake, and fights Gin himself. Juuga beats Gin to the very brink of death, causing Fuuga to sacrifice himself to revive him, due to an old legend about there being only one living warrior of 'Zetsu' at a time. The resurrected Gin kills Juuga in his rage over the fallen Fuuga.

=== Other characters ===
Gaō (牙王)
Reima's ancestor, and the first wolf to take his pack underground to flee the humans. Once in the Underworld, he and his soldiers fought the 5-headed dragon Jaryuuki, and ate its flesh, giving birth to the supernatural powers of the Hakkenshi. He was betrayed by his rival pack, Gaia's ancestors, after allowing them to live in the Underworld with him.
Black Wolf (黒狼)
Gaia's ancestor and Gaō's rival, who also wanted to flee their eradication by humans. He asked to stay in the Underworld, and Gaō relented. However, he and his pack were always looking for a chance to take over.
Purple Wolf (紅狼)
Black Wolf's son, and another of Gaia's ancestors. Purple Wolf managed to do what his father could not, and took over the Underworld, killing Reima's parents.
Jaryuuki (邪龍鬼)
A 5-headed demon resembling a dragon who resided in the Underworld before Gaō and his soldiers came. After a battle lasting three days and three nights, eight wolves managed to kill Jaryuuki. Those wolves ate its flesh, and gained powers, thus forming the Hakkenshi.

== Ginga Densetsu Weed- ==
=== Protagonists ===
==== Weed ====
Voiced by: Sachi Kokuryu

Weed (ウィード Weed): blue brindle Akita Inu Kishu Inu Youngest son of legendary leader, Gin and Sakura. He is father of Sirius, Orion, Rigel and Bellatrix. Like his father, he is often mistaken for a girl. He is kind and is great warrior also like his father.

==== GB ====
Voiced by: Naru Kawamoto

GB (G.B. GB): English Setter Weed's guardian and protector. He is somewhat of a comical element in the manga and anime along with Sasuke. He was once a pet dog, but his owner suicided and he became the slave of Nero. He later finds courage in himself by watching Weed and becomes Weed's godfather. In the manga, he is killed by one of the Hybrid bears.

==== Jerome ====
Voiced by: Masaya Takatsuka

Jerome (ジェロム Jeromu): German Shepherd Weed's strategist. He was originally the leader of a team of domesticated dogs whose mission was to kill Kaibutsu, but after all his comrades died and Kaibutsu was killed, he joined the Ōu army. He has a kind side, as he was the only friend Kaibutsu had and he is also a skilled fighter. He is banished for a while after disobeying Weed by killing two of Hougen's henchmen. In anime, He dies from drowning. In manga, he became mate of Lydia and the father of Lenov, Sunny, Tetsuo, Maru, Akira and Tonov.

==== Ken ====
Voiced by: Teruaki Ogawa

Ken (けん Ken) Great Dane Saluki mix Oldest son of Ben and Cross and brother of George and Minnie. He is somewhat violent but has respect for older soldiers and can be friendly.

==== Kagetora ====
Voiced by: Eiji Takemoto

Kagetora (カゲトラ Kagetora):Kai Ken Oldest son of Kurotora and brother of Harutora and Nobutora. He is short-tempered in the manga, but in the anime he is much more calm and logical than Ken.

==== Tesshin ====
Voiced by: Kousuke Takeuchi

Tesshin (てっしん Tesshin) Koga, son of Kurojaki. He is extremely loyal to Gin, since he was the one who raised him after Kurojaki died. He mastered a weaker version of the Zetsou Tenrou Battouga.

==== Kyōshirō ====
Voiced by: Yūki Masuda

Kyōshirō (しろがね きょうしろう Kyōshirō): Kishu Inu The leader of a pack of fifty young dogs that were abused by their parents. He is extremely violent and short-tempered and even challenges Weed at first. He used to believe that violence is justice and that refusing to kill is the act of a coward. After Toube's death, he swore to get more mature and cool-headed, although he can have angry outbursts from time to time.

==== Mel ====
Voiced by: Akiko Kobayashi

Mel (メル Mel): Golden Retriever A small puppy who was the slave of Blue but later joined the Ōu army. He is very loyal to Ōu army and he is quite courageous. He is acts as a messenger. He later grows up to be a mature adult and sometimes controls Kyoshiro when Kyoshiro's temper gets loose.

==== Rocket ====
Voiced by: Takeshi Maeda

Originally one of Hougen's minions along with his brothers, Jet and Missile. After getting exposed as a spy and getting defeated by the Ōu army, he decides to join them, leaving behind his brothers. He becomes loyal and courageous after joining the Ōu army and acts as a messenger, due to his speed.

==== Hiro ====
Voiced by: Kenji Nomura, Akiyo Kanada (Young)

Hiro (ヒロ Hiro): Great Pyrenees He is a strong, one-eyed fighter and gets furious when somebody abuses defenseless enemies or females. He is vengeful towards Kamakiri, who killed his father, Yukimasa and slashed his eye. He later becomes the mate of Reika and the father of Kin, Tama, Jirōmaru and Kōta. In Ginga: The Last Wars, he get killed by Monsoon after saving Gin.

==== Reika ====
Voiced by: Rie Nakagawa

Reika (麗華 Reika): Akita Inu A female loyal to Gin. Her father was an Ōu soldier. She is kidnapped by Hougen but manages to escape. She later becomes Hiro's mate in the manga and the mother of Kin, Tama, Jirōmaru and Kōta. In the anime, she is redesigned to be younger and around Weed's age; implying that they are to become mates.

==== Lydia ====
Lydia (リディア Ridia): German Shepherd Sister of Maxim and mate of Jerome and the mother of Lenov, Sunny, Tetsuo, Maru, Akira and Tonov. In Ginga: The Last Wars, she was wounded by one of the bears as it crushes her back. Her spine was hit so hard that it damaged her internal organs and she dies.

==== Koyuki ====
Koyuki (小雪): Kishu Inu, she is mate of Weed in the manga and mother of Sirius, Orion, Rigel and Bellatrix.

==== Joe ====
Akita Inu Kishu Inu, he is middle son of Gin and Sakura. He is middle brother of Yukimura and Weed. He is father of Kōshirō. In Ginga Densetsu Weed: Orion, he dies from drowning to save his nephew, Orion.

==== Yukimura ====
Yukimura (幸村): Akita Inu Kishu Inu mix, he is oldest son of Gin and Sakura. He is oldest brother of Joe and Weed. He dies from wound after killing Shōgun.

==== Izō ====
Voiced by: Susumu Akagi

Izō (以蔵 Izou): A Siberian Husky Alaskan Malamute mix. Eldest son of Kisaragi and brother of Denshichi, Kazuki, Kichinosuke, Kogorō, Miu, Saburō, Shinsaku, Shinsaku, Shintarō and unnamed older two brothers. He is mate of Sayoko and the father of Harunobu, Hiroshi, Kuranosuke, Masami, Masaru.

==== Hook ====
Voiced by: Kan Tanaka

Hook (ック Fukku): A Labrador Retriever/Dalmatian mix.

==== George ====
George (譲二 Jouji): A Great Dane Saluki mix. Second son of Ben and Cross and the middle one of siblings Ken and Minnie.

=== Antagonists ===
==== Kaibutsu/ P4 ====
Voiced by: Kong Kuwata

A scientifically mutated dog which Jerome was supposed to guard with his squad. He is the main antagonist in the Monster Arc. His appearance is turned horrifying by human experiments on him and he holds extreme, beastly hatred at them for that. He takes over Gajou and starts attacking dogs and humans of that area, causing Gin's mate, Sakura, to escape the place with Smith. Jerome sympathizes with him at first for suffering but later turns against him for eating humans.

==== Blue ====
Voiced by: Shunsuke Sakuya

A Beauceron who enslaves little puppies in a mountainous forest with his friends Ned and Bell and force them to steal food from humans. He is a minor antagonist in the Monster Arc. He killed Hook's brother when he stood up to him.

==== Hougen ====
Voiced by: Koji Ishii

A brutal, tyrannical and clever harlequin Great Dane who kidnaps Gin and John and takes over Gajou. He is the main antagonist in the Hougen Arc. He and his brother were born in a locked up shack with some other dogs and after their owner failed to show up for a long time, they were forced to cannibalize their inmates and when the owner came back, they killed and ate him too along with attacking two policemen tracking down the owner. Hougen kills any dog who fails in a mission and his ultimate goal is to gather as many dogs as possible and then take revenge on humans. Regardless, he's as cruel and merciless to dogs as he is to humans. He openly insults his enemies and holds extreme strength, managing to survive after taking two Battougas and several bites to the skull.

==== Genba ====
Voiced by: Masami Iwasaki

Hougen's younger brother. He takes over Gajou and kills three of Kurotora's four nephews, who were trying to protect it. He has floppy ears unlike his brother who has cropped ears and is less clever than his brother. During their younger ages, the brothers promised that the first one to die between them will die in the other brother's fangs. He is the only thing that Hougen actually loves and trusts. He gets into a fight with Tesshin and falls and hits his head on a rock, causing him to become paralyzed and have memory loss.

==== Kamakiri ====
Voiced by: Yoshitaka Kaidu

A greedy, cruel and egotistic old Irish Wolfhound who killed Hiro's father and attempted to kill Hiro to take over his pack. He joins forces with Hougen and becomes one of his most efficient and strongest comrades. However, he isn't really loyal to Hougen, wanting to slowly manipulate the pack and become the leader himself. and is somewhat bitter against him for being the leader. His love for power is expressed strongly after he is promoted to be the highest-ranking general after Genba's death.

== Ginga Densetsu Weed: Orion ==
=== Protagonists ===
==== Orion ====
Orion (オリオン): An Akita Inu Kishu Inu mix. Orion is the protagonists of Ginga Densetsu Weed: Orion, Ginga: The Last Wars & Ginga Densetsu Noah. He is second oldest son of Weed, Koyuki and brother of Sirius, Rigel and Bellatrix. He resembling his uncle Yukimura and great-grandfather Riki.

==== Sirius ====
Sirius (シリウス, Shiriusu): An Akita Inu Kishu Inu mix. Sirius is the protagonists of Ginga Densetsu Weed: Orion and Ginga: The Last Wars. He is the oldest son of Weed, Koyuki. He is brother of Orion, Rigel and Bellatrix. He looks just like his father in every way. He dies from his own injuries caused by Monsoon.

==== Rigel ====
Rigel (リゲル, Rigeru): An Akita Inu Kishu Inu mix. Rigel is the protagonists of Ginga Densetsu Weed: Orion and Ginga: The Last Wars. He is the youngest son of Weed, Koyuki. He is brother of Sirius, Orion and Bellatrix. His color is fairly unusual, since none of his known ancestors are black.

==== Bellatrix ====
Bellatrix (ベラトリクス, Beratorikusu): An Akita Inu Kishu Inu mix. Bellatrix is supporting character of Ginga Densetsu Weed: Orion and Ginga: The Last Wars. She is the only daughter of Weed, Koyuki. She is youngest sister of Sirius, Orion and Rigel.

==== Bon ====
Bon (ボン): An Berger Blanc Suisse.

==== Andy Valkama ====
Andy Valkama (アンディ バルコム, Andi Barukomu): A German Shepherd mix. Andy is a main character of Ginga Densetsu Weed: Orion, Ginga: The Last Wars and Ginga Densetsu Noah. Andy is nephew of John.

==== Yamabiko Kurohabaki ====
Yamabiko Kurohabaki (オリオン): An Kai Ken mix. Yamabiko is a main character of Ginga Densetsu Weed: Orion, Ginga: The Last Wars and Ginga Densetsu Noah. He is the youngest son of Terumune Kurohabaki, and the brother of Masamune Kurohabaki. In Ginga: The Last Wars, he is the current leader of the Kurohabaki Clan since his father and brother's death.

==== Shirozaru ====
Shirozaru (白申): An Kishu Inu mix. Shirozaru is one of the major characters in the Ginga Densetsu Weed: Orion and Ginga: The Last Wars. He is grandson of Akame and older brother of Muu and Rara.

==== Muu ====
Muu (無有): An Kishu Inu mix. Muu is one of Akame's grandson. He is the middle brother of Shirozaru and Rara.

==== Rara ====
Rara (羅々): An Kishu Inu mix. Rara is one of Akame's grandson and the younger brother of Shirozaru and Muu.

==== Nyūdōunsai Sanada ====
Nyūdōunsai Sanada (真田 入道雲斎, Sanada Nyuudouunsai): An unknown breed dog.

==== Gennai Ogasawara ====
Gennai Ogasawara (小笠原 玄内, Ogasawara Gennai): An unknown breed dog.

=== Antagonists ===
==== Akakamakiri ====
Akakamakiri (赤カマキリ): An Irish Wolfhound mix. Akakamakiri is the oldest son of Kamakiri and older brother of Kurokamakiri and Kamajirō.

==== Kamajirō ====
Kamajirō (カマ次郎, Kamajirou): An Irish Wolfhound mix. Kamajirō is middle son of Kamakiri and brother of Akakamakiri and Kurokamakiri.

==== Kurokamakiri ====
Kurokamakiri (黒カマキリ): An Irish Wolfhound mix. Kurokamakiri is the youngest son of Kamakiri and youngest brother of Akakamakiri and Kamajirō.

==== Kenshin Nokizaru ====
Kenshin Nokizaru (軒猿 謙信): An unknown breed dog. Kenshin is the leader of the Nokizaru Clan. He was an ally of the Kurohabaki Clan and later of the Ōu army. In Ginga: The Last Wars, he is killed by Monsoon. In Ginga Densetsu Noah, it's revealed that he is son of Shinzō Nokizaru and the father of Nobushi and Shikoro Nokizaru.

==== Masamune Kurohabaki ====
Masamune Kurohabaki (黒脛巾 政宗, Kurohabaki Masamune): An Kai Ken mix. Masamune is the main antagonist of Ginga Densetsu Weed: Orion. He is the leader of the Kurohabaki Clan after he banished his father and took over leadership of the clan until his death.

== Ginga: The Last Wars ==
=== Maru ===
Maru (マル): A German Shepherd. Maru is one of the sons of Jerome and Lydia. He is brother of Lenov, Sunny, Tetsuo, Akira and Tonov.

=== Sunny ===
Sunny (サニー, Sanii): A German Shepherd. Sunny is one of the sons of Jerome and Lydia. He is brother of Lenov, Maru, Tetsuo, Akira and Tonov.

=== Lenov ===
Lenov (レノフ, Renofu): A German Shepherd. Lenov is one of the sons of Jerome and Lydia. He is brother of Maru, Sunny, Tetsuo, Akira and Tonov. In Ginga: The Last Wars, he is first son to die by Monsoon's Kin.

=== Akira ===
Akira (アキラ): A German Shepherd. Akira is one of the children of Jerome and Lydia. In Ginga: The Last Wars, Akira and Tetsuo dies to save their mother and brother from Monsoon's Kin.

=== Tetsuo ===
Tetsuo (テツオ): A German Shepherd. Tetsuo is one of the children of Jerome and Lydia. In Ginga: The Last Wars, Tetsuo and Akira dies to save their mother and brother from Monsoon's Kin.

=== Tonov ===
Tonov (トーノフ, Toonofu): A German Shepherd. Tonov is one of the sons of Jerome and Lydia. Tonov is currently with Reika, Kin, Tama, Jirōmaru and Kōta. In Ginga Densetsu Noah, Tonov was killed by Aka-Ari Army along with Kōta and Jirōmaru.

=== Tamasaburō ===
Tamasaburō (タマ三郎, Tamasaburou): A Great Pyrenees Akita Inu mix. Known as Tama is third oldest son of Hiro and Reika. He is brother of Kin, Jirōmaru and Kōta. In Ginga Densetsu Noah, he is killed by Beniō, Wangwang and Shuō.

=== Kinta ===
Kinta (キン太): A Great Pyrenees Akita Inu mix. Known as Kin is the youngest son of Hiro and Reika. He is brother of Tama, Jirōmaru and Kōta.

=== Jirōmaru ===
Jirōmaru (次郎丸, Jiroumaru): A Great Pyrenees Akita Inu mix. Jirōmaru is second oldest son of Hiro and Reika. He is brother of Tama, Kin, and Kōta. In Ginga Densetsu Noah, he was killed by Aka-Ari Army along with Kōta and Tonov.

=== Kōta ===
Kōta (紅太, Kouta): A Great Pyrenees Akita Inu mix. Kōta is eldest son of son of Hiro and Reika. He is brother of Kin, Tama, and Jirōmaru. In Ginga Densetsu Noah, he was killed by Aka-Ari Army along with Jirōmaru and Tonov.

=== Shion ===
Shion (シオン, Zion): A Great Pyrenees Akita Inu mix. Shion is protagonist of Shion No Kaze and Ginga: The Last Wars. He is the son of and Billy, and the brother of his eight siblings. In Ginga: The Last Wars, it is revealed that he is grandson of one of Gin's Siblings and can speak language of bears due to his friendship with them in other regions of Japan.

=== Antagonists ===
==== Monsoon ====
Monsoon (モンスーン, Monsuun): A Eurasian brown bear and the main antagonist of Ginga: The Last Wars. He is the son of Akakabuto, who is killed by Gin from events of Silver Fang -The Shooting Star Gin-.

==== Bob ====
Bob (ボブ, Bobu): A Mixed Breed.

== Ginga Densetsu Noah ==
=== Antagonists ===
==== Wangwang ====
Wangwang (王王): A Tibetan Mastiff. He is the first Three Heavenly Kings of the Aka-Ari Army. He is the older brother of Beniō and Shuō.

==== Beniō ====
Beniō (紅王, Beniou): A Tibetan Mastiff. He is the second of the Three Heavenly Kings of the Aka-Ari Army. He is the younger brother of Wangwang and Shuō

==== Shuō ====
Shuō (朱王, Shuou): A Tibetan Mastiff. He is the third one of the Three Heavenly Kings of the Aka-Ari Army. He is the brother of Wangwang and Beniō.
