= Shikoku dog =

Shikoku Ken
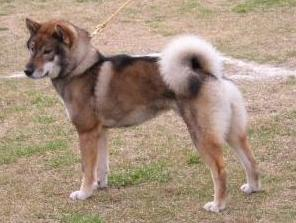
- Other names: Kochi-ken
- Origin: Japan
Kennel club standards
- Japan Kennel Club: standard
- Fédération Cynologique Internationale: standard

The Shikoku (四国犬, Shikoku Inu, Shikoku-ken; Japanese pronunciation: [ɕi̥.ko.kɯꜜ i.nɯ]) or Kōchi Inu (高知犬) is a Japanese breed of dog from Shikoku island, Japan. The Shikoku Ken is listed as a Foundation Stock Service breed with the American Kennel Club (AKC) and is fully recognized by the United Kennel Club. Its name is often abbreviated to merely Shikoku.

It is one of the medium-sized large game hunting dogs native to Japan, originating from the mountainous island of Shikoku where they were prevalent hunters of deer, boar and other indigenous wildlife. They are typical of other Japanese spitz-type hounds with a dense and harsh coat, erect ears, and a tail that is held over their back. Their development in rough terrain has allowed for Shikokus to be excellent hiking companions and adept climbers.

According to AKC, "the Shikoku is a dog of marked endurance, keen in sense with a naive feeling, energetic and highly alert. He is an enthusiastic hunter and docile towards his master."

This is a rare breed, even in Japan. The Shikoku Ken's numbers are in gradual decline, similar to the fellow Nihon Ken Hozonkai breed Kishu Ken.

== Comparison to other Japanese breeds ==
The Shikoku is one of the six native Japanese breeds. Its size is intermediate, between the large Akita Inu and the smaller Shiba Inu; all are in the Spitz family of dogs.

Haruo Isogai, a Japanese cynologist and dog breeder, conducted a study in the 1930s and developed a classification system for Japanese dogs based on appearance. He classified all native Japanese dog breeds into three categories: large-, medium-, and small-sized. The Shikoku belongs to the Shika-inus, the medium-sized dogs. Other medium-sized dogs are the Kai Ken, the Ainu Ken and the Kishu Ken. His efforts were a nationalist response to the adoption by dog enthusiasts in Japan of European breeds in the 1930s.

== Characteristics and temperament ==
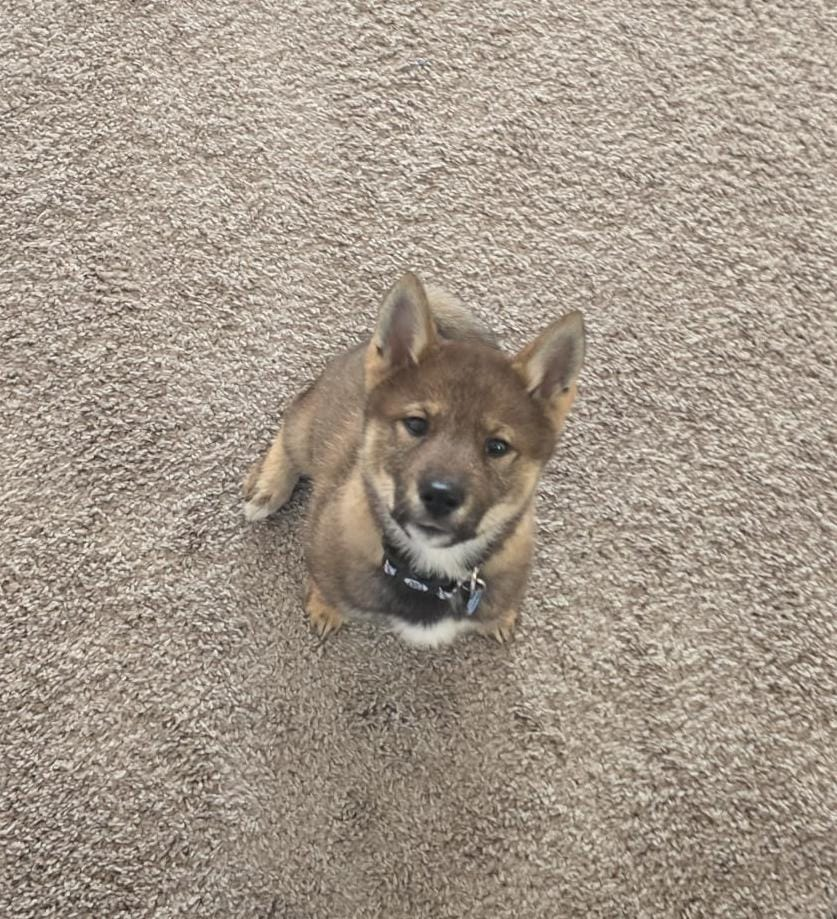
A well behaved 10 week old Shikoku puppy

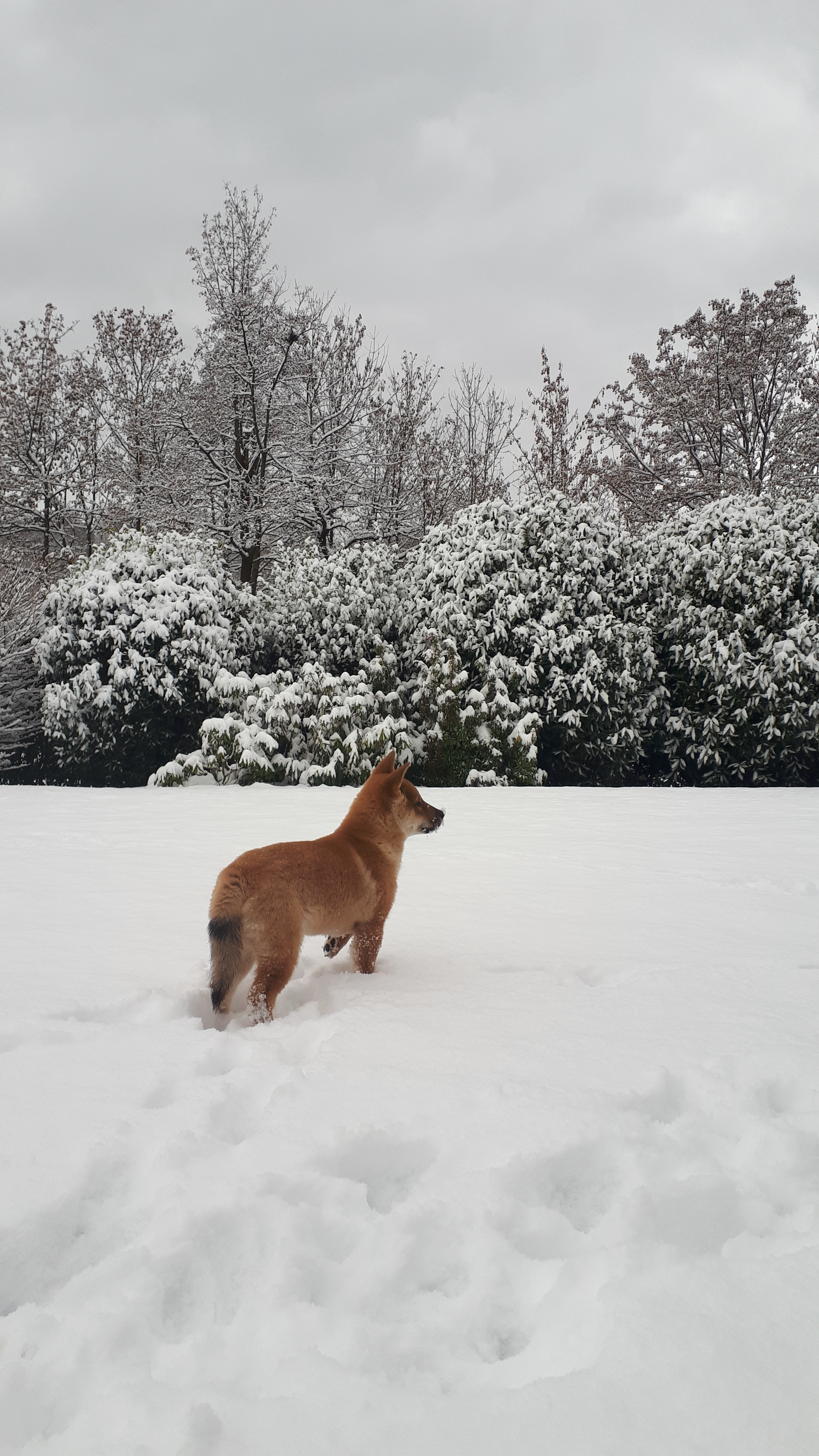
Shikoku puppy in the snow

Standard height should be 52 cm (20 in) for males and 49 cm (19 in) for females, with a +/- tolerance of 3 cm (1.2 in). Sexual dimorphism between males and females is evident in both the expression and the body type. The body is strong and muscular and always shown in working condition without excess weight. The ratio is slightly longer than tall at 11:10. The Shikoku has three coat colors: sesame, red sesame and black sesame.. An additional cream colored coat called pinto is rare and is not considered an accepted color for the breed standard. In all of these colors, there are pale markings on the ventral portion of the dog. Known as urajiro, it should be visible. These markings lie along a similar pattern to tan points on a black dog: in the eyebrow, on the side of the muzzle, on the cheeks, on the underside of the jaw, on the paws and the inside of the legs, and under the tail.

These are nimble and spirited dogs with sharp senses and a keen intuition, capable of becoming an ardent hunter, watchdog or companion. Fiercely loyal and docile to their owner, Shikokus are enthusiastic in demeanor and eager to hunt. Japanese hunters, the Matagi, trained the Shikoku in two main hunting styles: Hoeru-dome (吠える), barking to detain; and Kami-dome (噛み切る), biting to detain. The Hoeru-dome technique is preferred for the safety of the dog.

The breed has only one known major health issue: a predisposition to epilepsy. Canine focal metatarsal fistulation and neuronal ceroid lipofuscinocis have been seldom reported in Japan, specifically within the Shikoku region.

== Varieties ==
Out of the reconstruction effort, five distinct lines of the Shikoku were developed: the Eastern Iya and Kochi-Aki strains, as well as the Hata, Hongawa, and Awa western strains. More recently the distinction between these lines has been blurred as remote areas where the dogs originated became easier to access and lines were cross-bred. The Hongawa region maintains the purest bred dogs due to the area being difficult to access. The modern Shikoku is thought to descend mainly from the Hongawa and Hata lines as the Awa line essentially disappeared as a result of the hardships caused by World War II and a lack of quality specimens due to frequent cross breeding with outside dogs.

== See also ==
- List of dog breeds
- Awa Inu
