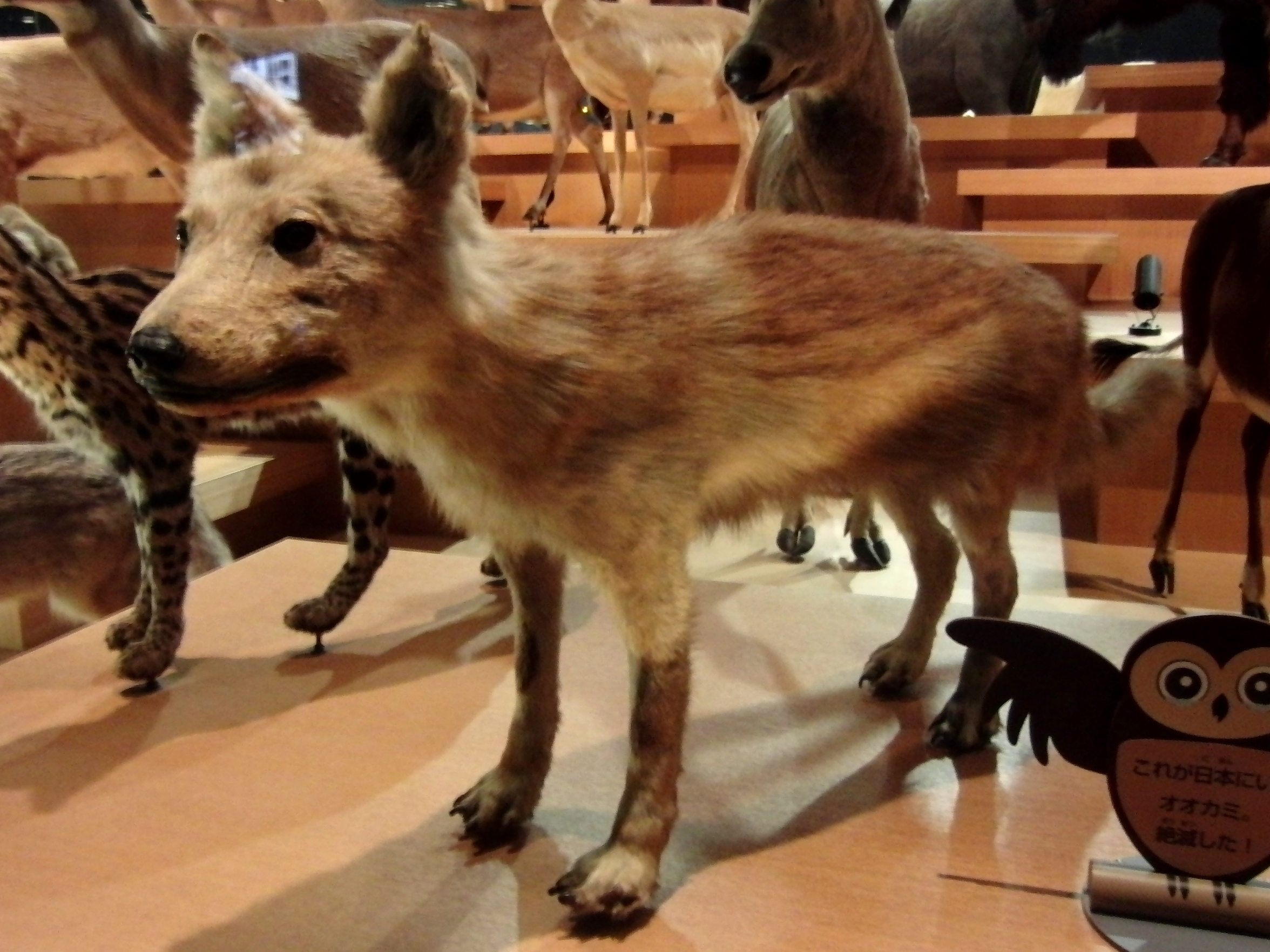
- Mounted specimen of a Japanese wolf at the National Museum of Nature and Science, Tokyo, Japan

Conservation status
- Extinct (1905) (IUCN 3.1)

Scientific classification
- Kingdom: Animalia
- Phylum: Chordata
- Class: Mammalia
- Order: Carnivora
- Family: Canidae
- Genus: Canis
- Species: C. lupus
- Subspecies: †C. l. hodophilax

Trinomial name
- †Canis lupus hodophilax (Temminck, 1839)

Synonyms
- Canis hodopylax (Temminck, 1844); Canis japonicus (Nehring, 1885)

= Japanese wolf =

Extinct subspecies of the gray wolf

The Japanese wolf (Japanese: ニホンオオカミ（日本狼）, Hepburn: Nihon ōkami, or 山犬, yamainu [see below]; Canis lupus hodophilax), also known as the Honshū wolf, is an extinct subspecies of the gray wolf that was once endemic to the islands of Honshū, Shikoku, and Kyūshū in the Japanese archipelago.

It was one of two subspecies that were once found in the Japanese archipelago, the other being the Hokkaido wolf. Genetic sequencing indicates that the Japanese wolf was highly divergent from living wolf populations.

Despite long being revered in Japan, the introduction of rabies and canine distemper to Japan led to the decimation of the population, and policies enacted during the Meiji Restoration led to the persecution and eventual extermination of the subspecies by the early 20th century. Well-documented observations of similar canids have been made throughout the 20th and 21st centuries, and have been suggested to be surviving Japanese wolves. Due to environmental and behavioral factors, though, doubts persist over their identity.

== Etymology ==
C. hodopylax's binomial name derives from the Greek hodos (path) and phylax (guardian), in reference to Okuri-inu from Japanese folklore, which portrayed wolves or weasels as the protectors of travelers.

Numerous other aliases have referred to Japanese wolf, and the name ōkami (wolf) is derived from the Old Japanese öpö-kamï, meaning either "great-spirit" where wild animals were associated with the mountain spirit Yama-no-kami in the Shinto religion, or "big dog", or "big bite" (ōkami or ōkame), and "big mouth"; Ōkuchi-no-Makami (Japanese) was an old and deified alias for Japanese wolf, where it was both worshipped and feared, and it meant "a true god with big-mouth" based on several theories; either referring to wolf's mouth with associations with several legends and folklore such as the wolf guided Yamato Takeru and was titled so by the prince, or a region in Asuka called Ōkuchi-no-Makami-no-Hara where Asuka no Kinunui no Konoha (Japanese) lived and a number of people were said to be killed by an old wolf there.

== Taxonomy and origin ==
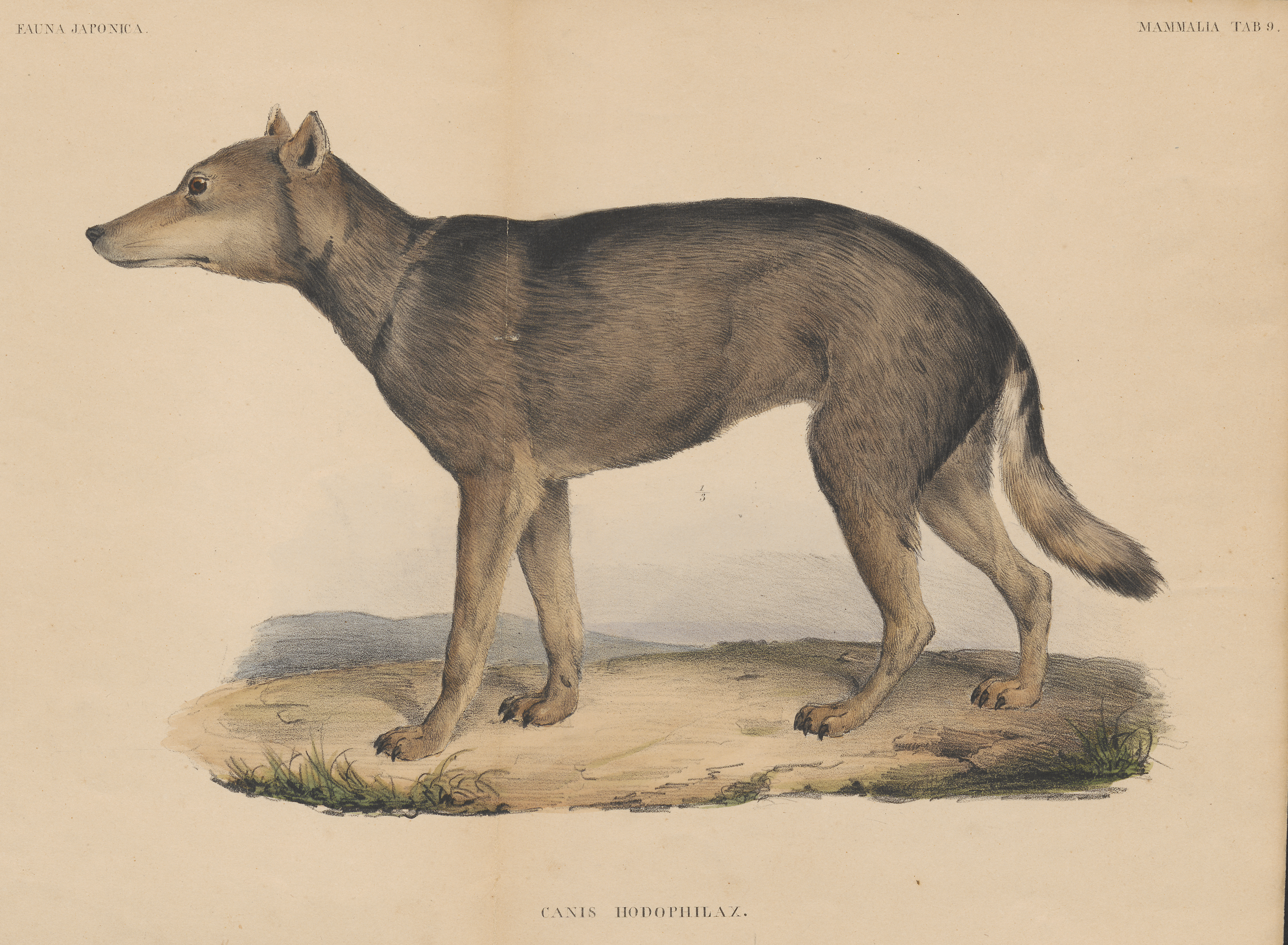
Temminck's depiction of a specimen kept by Siebold, which may have been a "mountain dog" rather than a true Japanese wolf

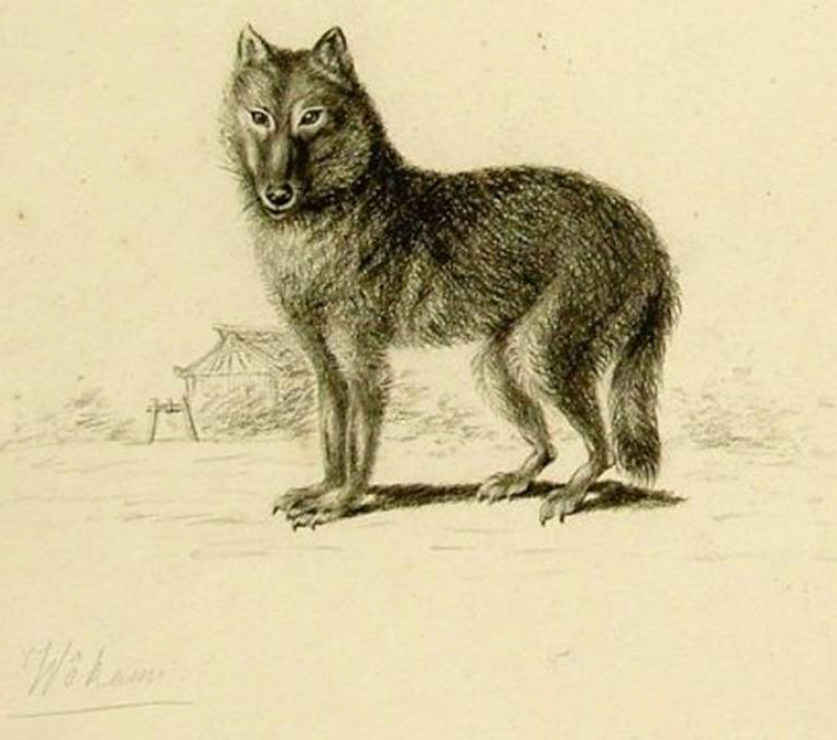
Carl Hubert de Villeneuve's sketch of Siebold's captive specimen is probably the only authentic European depiction of the animal unambiguously identified as a wolf rather than a "mountain dog".

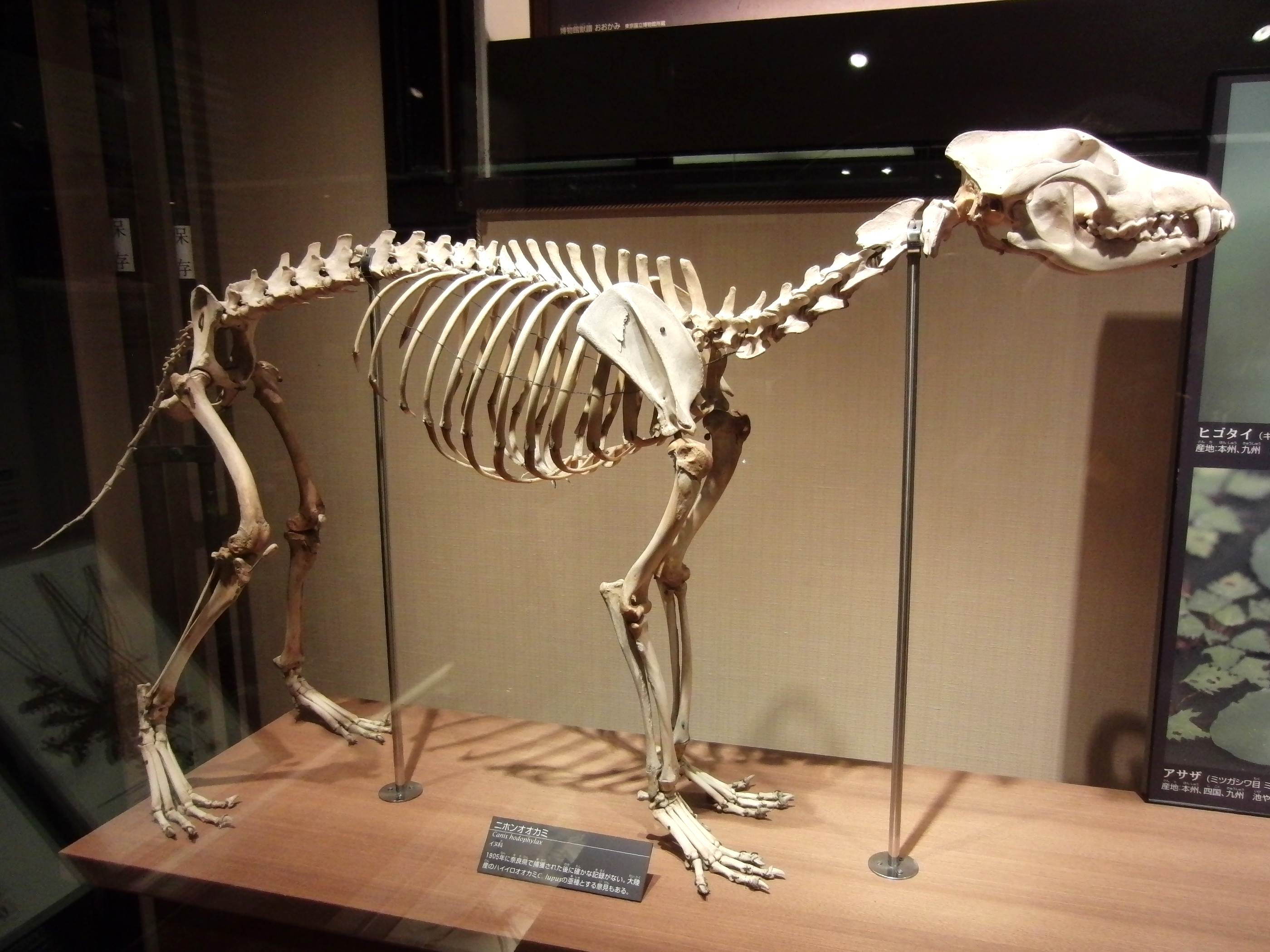
Mounted skeleton, National Museum of Nature and Science

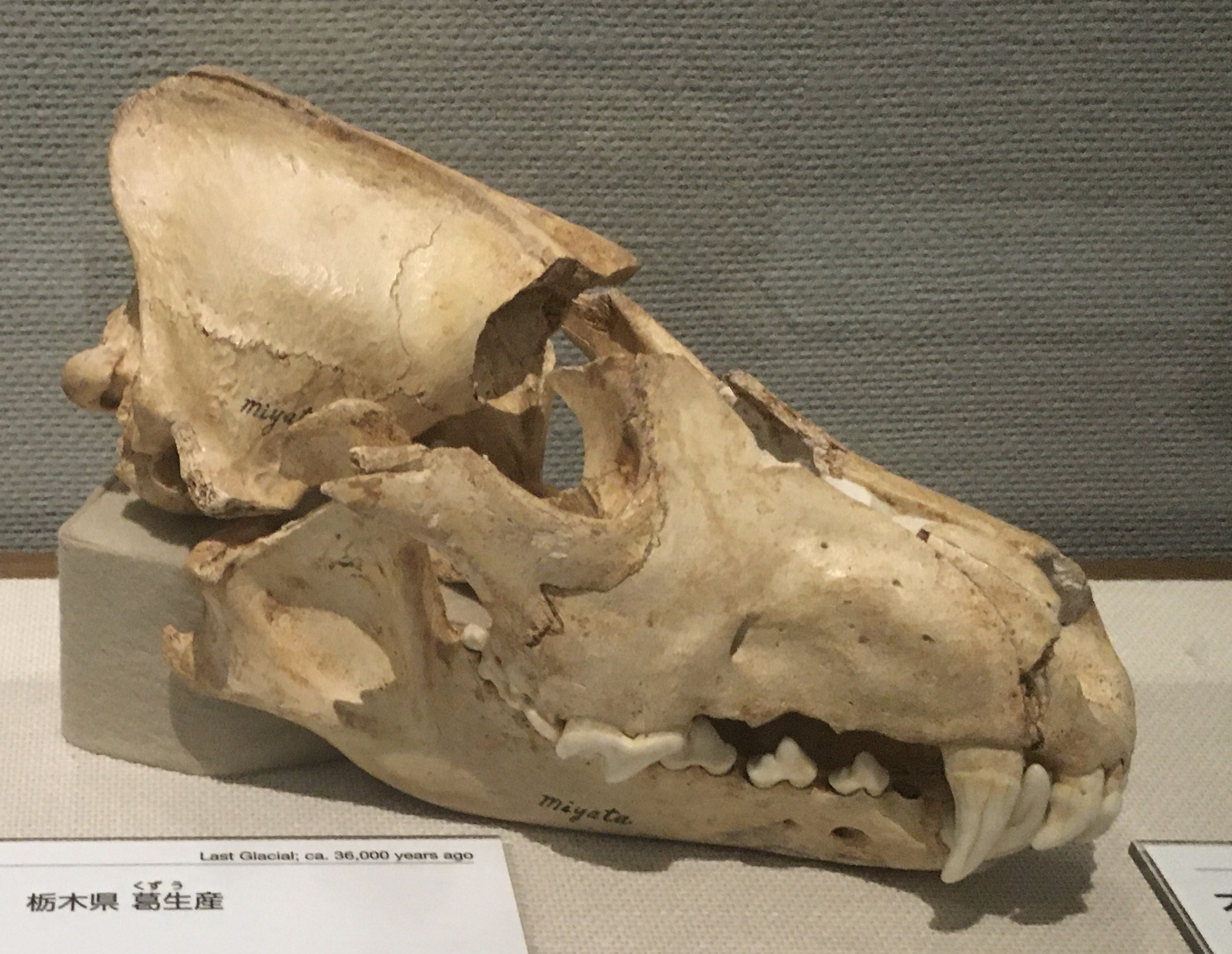
Skull unearthed at the Aisawa Quarry of Miyata Lime Industry, dated 33,000–36,000 years old. The left lower jaw bone is 17.9 cm in length.

=== Nomenclature: "ōkami" and "yamainu" ===
Before Dutch zoologist Coenraad Jacob Temminck classified it, it had been long recognized in Japan that Honshu was inhabited by two distinct canids, ōkami (wolf) and yamainu ("mountain dog", likely a type of feral dog), both of which were described by herbalist Ono Ranzan in his Honzō kōmoku keimō ("An instructional outline of natural studies") in 1803. He described the ōkami as an edible, but rapacious, greyish-brown animal with a long, ash-colored, white-tipped tail with webbed toes and triangular eyes that would occasionally threaten people if rabid or hungry. In contrast, the yamainu was described as a similar animal, but with speckled yellowish fur, unwebbed toes, a foul odor and inedible meat.

Ranzan's works were studied by German botanist Philipp Franz von Siebold during his tenure in Dejima. He purchased a female mountain dog and a wolf in 1826, describing both in his notes as distinct, and preparing two sketches illustrating their differences. The skin of the mountain dog was subsequently shipped to the Rijksmuseum van Natuurlijke Historie in the Netherlands and mounted. The specimen, along with Siebold's notes, were used by Temminck as references for his scientific classification of the animal in Fauna Japonica (1839). Temminck, however, misinterpreted Siebold's notes distinguishing the wolf and the mountain dog and treated the two as synonyms. In 1842, he wrote a longer description, still confounding the two names, and producing a sketch of a "wolf" based on Siebold's mounted mountain dog specimen.

=== Skeletal and genetic findings ===
The Japanese wolf, or Honshū wolf, (Canis lupus hodophilax Temminck, 1893) is a subspecies of the gray wolf (Canis lupus). Skeletal remains of the Japanese wolf have been found in archaeological sites, such as Torihama shell mounds, dating from the Jōmon period (10,000 to 250 B.C).

The Japanese wolf inhabited Kyushu, Shikoku, and Honshu Islands but not Hokkaido Island. This indicates that its ancestor may have migrated from the Asian continent through the Korean Peninsula into Japan. The phylogenetic tree generated from its mitochondrial DNA sequences revealed a long branch that separated the Japanese wolf from other gray wolf populations and that it belongs to the ancient mDNA haplogroup 2 (represented today by the Italian wolf and scattered pockets of other wolves across Eurasia), while the Hokkaido wolf belongs to mDNA haplogroup 1 and this suggests that the Japanese wolf was the first arrival on the Japanese archipelago with the Hokkaido wolf arriving more recently from the north. The wolf was estimated to have arrived in Japan during the Late Pleistocene between 25,000 and 125,000 years ago, however a more recent study that looked at the past sea levels of the Korean Strait together with the timing of the Japanese wolf sequences indicated that it arrived to the southern islands less than 20,000 YBP. There have been several excavations of a large canid, which was comparable in size to North American dire wolf, dating the Late Pleistocene from Aomori and Shizuoka prefectures, however its relationship with either C. lupus hodophilax or C. lupus is unclear.

See further: Evolution of the wolf – North America and Japan

An examination of sequences from 113 ancient Canis specimens from China and Russia did not match, which indicated that none of these specimens were the ancestors of the Japanese wolf.

Analyses of the mitochondrial DNA of 1576 dogs worldwide revealed that one Kishu and one Siberian Husky possessed the same haplotype as a Japanese wolf, indicating past cross-breeding. A more-refined study of Japanese wolf mitochondrial DNA showed that they could be further divided into two separate groups, and that the sequences from one Kishu, one Siberian Husky and one Shiba Inu could also be divided into the two groups. These dogs correspond to clade F of the mDNA phylogenetic tree among worldwide dogs, with clade F haplogroup dogs originating from a rare admixture between male dogs and more than one female ancestor of Japanese wolves, which have contributed to the dog gene pool.

In 2021, a genomic study found the Japanese wolf to descend from Pleistocene Siberian wolves and genetically distinct from living Eurasian wolves. The study found this lineage to occupy its own branch on the gray wolf family tree, with the modern gray wolf and most domestic dogs (aside from Native American dogs and some Asian breeds) being more closely related to each other than Siberian Pleistocene wolves. (Note: In contrast, a study later that year found the Japanese wolf to be the closest wild relative of domestic dogs in general. Japanese wolves were found to be most closely related to East Eurasian dog breeds, with both lineages diverging only after their ancestral lineage split from that of the West Eurasian dog breeds; however, many West Eurasian dog breeds have also inherited Japanese wolf ancestry due to admixture with East Eurasian breeds. The study found the dingo and New Guinea singing dog to genetically be the closest to the Japanese wolf, sharing almost 5.5% genomic introgression.) A 2022 study which sequenced the genome of a 35,000 year old wolf from Japan found that Holocene Japanese wolf represented the hybrid of separate migrations of wolves into Japan, one of Siberian Pleistocene wolves around 57-35,000 years ago, and later waves of mixed Pleistocene Siberian wolf and modern wolf ancestry around 37-14,000 years ago. A 2024 study found that Japanese wolves were nested within the diversity of living wolves as more closely related to (but not nested within) Eurasian wolves than to North American wolves, and that they were more closely related to domestic dogs than to other wolves, though Japanese wolves are unlikely to be the direct ancestors of domestic dogs. Contrary to the results of the 2021 and 2022 studies, no evidence was found for a close relationship with Siberian Pleistocene wolves and Holocene Japanese wolves (with the study finding that the 35,000 year old Japanese wolf more closely related to Pleistocene Siberian wolves than to Holocene Japanese wolves, contrary to the results of the 2022 study) which the authors suggested was likely the result of differences in statistical analysis.

Admixture with domestic and feral dogs had been common in Japan, and distinguishing the original wolf was already difficult as scientific approaches for classification and species identification only began in Meiji where authorities were troubled to distinguish damages by wolves and dogs. Intentional cross-breeding between wild wolves and female domestic dogs, being chained outside, to create strong breeds was common, and several "types" of "wolves" had been commonly recognized by publics including potential F1 hybrids. These aspects led Japanese researchers to indicate that hybridization was severe among wide ranges of the archipelago including Hokkaido, and may disrupt genetic and morphological studies to determine the true C. hodophilax and C. hattai.

Genetic analysis of Siebold's yamainu specimen using matrilineal mtDNA has found it to genetically match the Japanese wolf; however, its skull displays significant differences from other Japanese wolves. Due to this, it has been theorized that the yamainu may represent wolfdog hybrids between Japanese wolves and feral dogs, and Siebold's specimen was likely the offspring of a wolf mother and dog father.

== Description ==
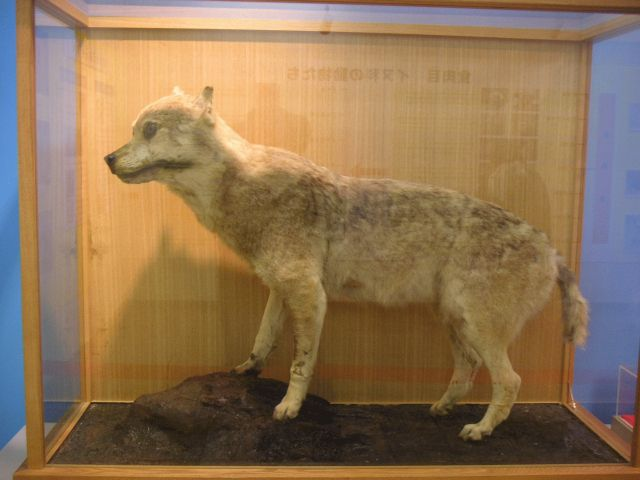
Mounted specimen in Ueno Zoo

Canis lupus hodophilax was described by Temminck in 1839 as smaller than Canis lupus lupus (Linnaeus 1758) and of shorter legs, with its coat smooth and short. The Japanese wolf was smaller than the Hokkaido wolf and other gray wolves from the Asian and North American continents. It stood 56–58 cm at the withers. The Japanese wolf was not the world's smallest wolf. The cranial length of the adult Arab wolf (Canis lupus arabs) measures on average 200.8 mm, which is smaller than most wolves. Specimens of the Japanese wolf were measured between 193.1 mm and 235.9 mm and it was uncertain if these were all from adults. The mandible, M1 (molar tooth) is relatively larger than in any other canid species. An examination in 1991 found one specimen's condylobasal length (a measure of skull length) to be 205.2 mm, and the Alveolar length of P4 (the fourth maxillary premolar or carnassial tooth) to be 20.0 mm (left) and 21.0 mm (right). In 2009, an osteological study declared that the skull of the Japanese wolf was between 206.4 mm to 226.0 mm in total length, and that morphological characters alone were not sufficient to distinguish the Japanese wolf from large domesticated dogs, such as the Akita breed. Remains of the wild native canine dating from the late Edo period (1603 and 1868), the Yama-Inu, has occasionally been confused with the Japanese wolf because of the osteological similarities between the two.

There are four mounted specimens believed to be Canis lupus hodophilax located at: the National Museum of Nature and Science, Japan; University of Tokyo, Japan; Wakayama University, Japan; Siebold Collection, and the National Museum of Natural History, Leiden, Netherlands.

=== Alleged variation ===
As mentioned above, descriptions of "ōkami" and "yamainu" by Ono Ranzan don't correspond, and several different "types" of wolves or wolf-like canids in Japanese islands were noted in literatures and reports, indicating these may or may not represent wolfdogs. For example, there exists a "big and black" one, and ones referred to as ohokami or ōkame that were aliases and potential synonyms of ōkami; the former is said to "have paddles on paws and swim" and to "leave footprints with five claws", and the latter to be "slender and long-haired" and could be one of animals kept by Siebold although this could also be a misidentified different canidae such as a dhole or a dog or a hybrid.

Some researchers believe yamainu could be one or more of distinct and unrecognized native canidae. One is small and shorter legs, but more primitive and somewhat mustelidae-like appearance, and may represent the art of yamainu kept by Siebold by Kawahara Keiga, depicted with stripes, and the specimen preserved at Ube shrine, claimed to be a C. hodophilax captured in Wakayama in 1949, more than four decades after the last confirmed record. The other is a large canid that also inhabited Hokkaido predating Hokkaido wolf, and was described to "have different paws and fur patterns, different vocalization and behavioral patterns to jump and dance when agitated, disproportionate measurements compared to European wolves with notably shorter legs and a larger head while having similar trunk length for Hokkaido while muzzle for Honshu was shorter than Hokkaido's case".

== Range ==
The Japanese wolf inhabited Kyushu, Shikoku, and Honshu Islands but not Hokkaido Island. The remains of a 28,000-year-old wolf specimen from the Yana River on the northern coast of arctic Siberia matched the mDNA haplotype of the Japanese wolf, which indicates that they shared common ancestry and a wider distribution.

== History ==
In AD 713, the wolf first appeared on record in Kofudoki itsubun (Lost Writings on Ancient Customs). From AD 967, historical records indicated the wolf's preference for preying on horse, either wild horses or those in pastures, stables, and villages. In 1701, a lord introduced the first wolf bounty and by 1742 the first professional wolf hunters were using firearms and poison. In 1736, rabies appeared among dogs in eastern Japan, indicating that it had entered from China or Korea, then spread across the nation. Shortly afterward, it spread to the wolf population, turning some wolves from simple horse predators to man-killers that led to organized wolf hunts. Killing wolves became a national policy under the Meiji Restoration, and within one generation the Japanese wolf was extinct. The last Japanese wolf was captured and killed at Washikaguchi of Higashiyoshino village in Honshu Nara Prefecture, Japan on January 23, 1905.

Some interpretations of the Japanese wolf's extinction stress the change in local perceptions of the animal: both rabies-induced aggression and increasing deforestation of wolf habitat forced the wolves into conflict with humans, and this led to their being targeted by farmers.

Sightings of "short-legged dog like beasts", proposed to be the Japanese wolf, have been claimed since the time of its extinction until the last claim in 1997, but none of these have been verified. A claim in 2000 was dismissed as a hoax. Some Japanese zoologists believe that these reports "merely derive from misidentification of feral dogs".

=== Claimed post-extinction records ===
Despite the status, there have been various reports of canines resembling the Japanese wolf throughout the 20th century and in the 21st century including a case by foreign tourists. Three of these, a kill within Fukui Castle in 1910 and two sightings from Chichibu in 1996 and nearby Mount Sobo in 2000, involved closely taken images of each animal and scientific investigations, and a potential audio recording was made in 2018. These cases triggered debates both for and against the identities of the animals; however, affirmative biologists claimed morphological correspondences of all to Canis lupus hodophilax rather than misidentifications of feral animals such as a Eurasian wolf for the 1910 capture or Shikoku dog for the sighting in 2000. For 1910 record, scientists agreed that this was a Canis while some pointed to the possibility of a Eurasian wolf that fled from a mobile zoo four or five days before; however, a staff of the zoo checked the corpse and confirmed that the animal captured was different.

The 1996 sighting was in Chichibu Tama Kai National Park; the photographer, Hiroshi Yagi, spotted a wolf-like animal walking along the side of the road, and photographed it several times; the canine displayed no fear, even walking right up to him. Several experts who analyzed photographs conceded that the animal closely resembled a Japanese wolf. Other reports of wolf-like animals had also been made by Chichibu residents. Yagi had also previously heard potential Japanese wolf howls while working at a mountaineering lodge in the 1970s. Following the 1996 sighting, Yagi began research into the potential survival of the Japanese wolf, being assisted by other individuals over the years. Eventually, Yagi's team set up over 70 camera traps in the Okuchichibu Mountains; in 2018, one camera recorded footage of deer running by, with a howl heard in the background. Analysis of the howl by specialists found it to be nearly identical to that of an eastern wolf (C. lycaon).

Despite all the numerous well-attested sightings or recordings of canids closely resembling or having similar voices to wolves, significant doubt persists among experts for the species' continued survival, as the Japanese wolf primarily travelled in small packs, while most of the alleged sightings have been of singular individuals. In addition, the Japanese wolf inhabited deciduous forests composed largely of Japanese beech, but over 40% of this habitat was logged following World War II and replaced with plantations of sugi and hinoki; these artificial coniferous forests likely would not support the diversity that the Japanese wolf relied on. It is still likely that the Japanese wolf is extinct, and only DNA evidence can confirm or deny the identity of the sighted wild canids as Japanese wolves.

== Culture ==
In the Shinto belief, the ōkami ("wolf") is regarded as a messenger of the kami spirits and also offers protection against crop raiders such as the wild boar and deer. Wild animals were associated with the mountain spirit Yama-no-kami. The mountains of Japan, seen as a dangerous, deadly place, were highly associated with the wolf, which was believed to be their protector and guardian. Many mountain villages, such as Okamiiwa ("Wolf Rock") and Okamitaira ("Wolf Plateau"), are named after the wolf; this could be due to a sighting at the location, or a simple homage to the species.

There are an estimated 20 Shinto wolf shrines on Honshu alone. The most famous national shrine is located at Mitsumine in Chichibu, Saitama Prefecture and there are a number of smaller wolf shrines on the Kii Peninsula, including the Tamaki Shrine and the Takataki Shrine at Totsukawa village.

In Japanese folklore, there is the widely recorded belief of the okuriōkami ("escort wolf") that followed someone walking alone through a forest at night until they reach their home without doing them any harm. An offering was sometimes made for this escort. Another belief was of wolves that raised an infant who had been abandoned in the forests of the Kii Peninsula, and later became the clan leader Fujiwara no Hidehira. Another belief from the Kanto area of eastern Japan was that feeding an infant wolf's milk would make them grow up strong. Some legends portray the Japanese wolf as being prophetic creatures. In the Tamaki Mountains the location of a tree called "the cypress of dog-howls" is said to be the site where wolves howled immediately before a flood in 1889 warning the villagers, and before the great earthquake of 1923 even though the wolf was extinct by that time. Another belief was the "wolf notification" where a traveller does not return home, then a wolf comes to their home and makes a sad howling that signalled their death.

Some villages had wolf charms called shishiyoke that were believed to protect their village and their crops against wild boar. Wolf fangs, hide, and hair were carried by travelers to ward off evil spirits, and wolf skulls were kept in some home shrines to ward off misfortune. In some villages such as in Gifu Prefecture, the skull of the wolf was used as the charm for both protection as well as curing possessed villagers. In addition to protecting the crops, the wolf may leave prey for villagers.

The Japanese wolf has appeared in various popular media, such as the anime films Wolf Children and Princess Mononoke, the 2006 video game Ōkami, and the television series Kamen Rider Zero-One and Wonderful Pretty Cure!. In Wonderful Pretty Cure!, the main antagonists are vengeful wolf spirits who aim to destroy humanity as revenge for them causing the extinction of their species.
