= Teruaki Ogawa =

Japanese actor and voice actor (born 1968)

- 小川 輝晃
- Born: August 29, 1968 (age 58); Osaka, Japan
- Occupations: Actor, voice actor
- Years active: 1986-present
- Height: 177 cm (5 ft 10 in)

Teruaki Ogawa (小川 輝晃, Ogawa Teruaki; born August 29, 1968) is a Japanese actor and voice actor who is represented by 81 Produce. Ogawa was born in Osaka Prefecture, Japan, but was raised in Kashihara, Nara and is most known for portraying Sasuke/Ninja Red in Ninja Sentai Kakuranger.

== Filmography ==
=== Drama ===
Year	Title	Role	Network	Notes	Source
1994	Ninja Sentai Kakuranger	Sasuke / Ninja Red	TV Asahi	Lead role	
1998	Seijuu Sentai Gingaman	Hyuuga / Black Knight	TV Asahi	Lead role	
2005-2006	Ginga Legend Weed	Ken, Lecter			
2010	Tensou Sentai Goseiger	Satoshi Tamura	TV Asahi	episode 19	
2011	Kaizoku Sentai Gokaiger	Hyuuga	TV Asahi	episode 20	
2015	Shuriken Sentai Ninninger	Sasuke / Ninja Red	TV Asahi	episode 7	
2026	No.1 Sentai Gozyuger	Sasuke / Ninja Red	TV Asahi	episodes 44-45	

=== Movies ===
Year	Title	Role	Notes
1994	Super Sentai World	Ninja Red	Voice
1999	Seijuu Sentai Gingaman vs. Megaranger	Hyuuga / Black Knight	Direct-to-video release
2000	Kyuukyuu Sentai GoGoFive vs. Gingaman	Hyuuga / Black Knight	Direct-to-video release
2010	Kamen Rider × Kamen Rider OOO & W Featuring Skull: Movie War Core	Employee of Future Soft	
2011	Gokaiger Goseiger Super Sentai 199 Hero Great Battle	Black Knight, Ninja Red	Voice

=== Animation ===
Year	Title	Role	Notes	Source
2004	AM Driver	Dark Kalhole		
2013	Harlock: Space Pirate	Captain Harlock	Motion capture performer	
2014	HappinessCharge PreCure!	Masaru Aino		
2016	Gantz: O	Tetsuo Hara		

=== Video games ===
Year	Title	Role	Notes	Source
2005	Resident Evil 4	Leon S. Kennedy	Motion capture	
2016	Final Fantasy XV	Ardyn Izunia	Motion actor	
2017	Final Fantasy XV: Episode Gladiolus	Gilgamesh	Motion actor	

=== Dubbing ===
==== Live Action ====
- Boyd Holbrook
  - Narcos (2015), Steve Murphy
  - Logan (2017), Donald Pierce
  - The Predator (2018), Quinn McKenna
- Power Rangers Lost Galaxy (1999), Leo Corbett / the Red Galaxy Ranger
- Zombieland (2009), Columbus (Jesse Eisenberg)
- Super (2011), Frank Darbo / The Crimson Bolt (Rainn Wilson)
- Run All Night (2015), Mike Conlon (Joel Kinnaman)
- Zombieland: Double Tap (2019), Flagstaff (Thomas Middleditch)

==== Animation ====
- Mighty Ducks: The Animated Series (1996), Wildwing Flashblade (Ian Ziering) (2007 WOWOW Dub)
- Monsters Vs. Aliens (2009), Derek Dietl (Paul Rudd)
- Lego Star Wars: Summer Vacation (2022), Vic Vankoh ("Weird Al" Yankovic)
