= Kai Ken =

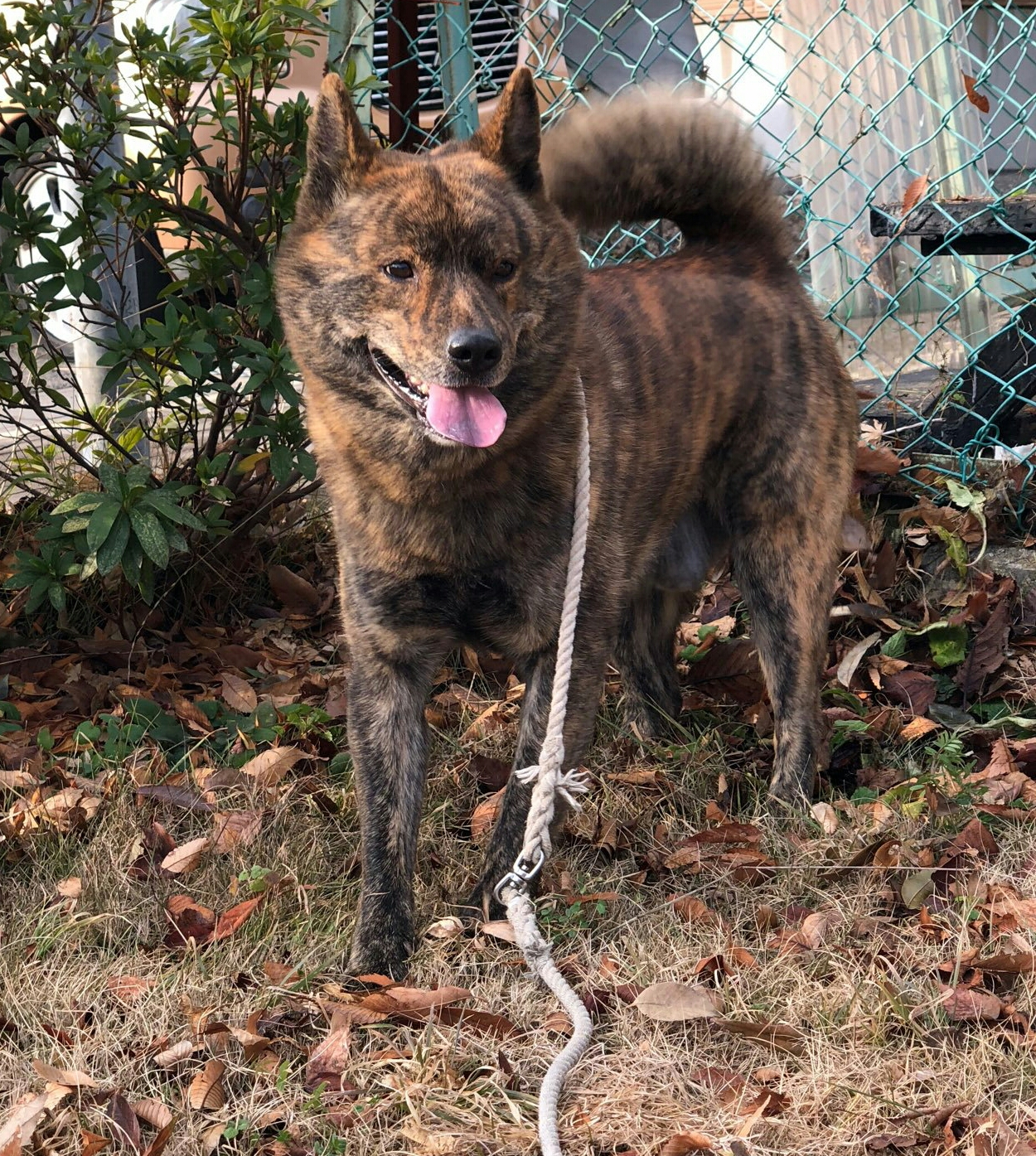
- A Kai Ken
- Other names: Kai
- Common nicknames: Tora Dog
- Origin: Japan
Traits
Height	Males	50–56 cm (20–22 in)
	Females	45–51 cm (18–20 in)
- Weight: 11–25 kg (25–55 lb)
- Coat: Double coat of medium length
- Color: Black brindle, red brindle and brindle.
Kennel club standards
- Japan Kennel Club: standard
- Fédération Cynologique Internationale: standard

The Kai Ken (甲斐犬, Kai Inu, Kai-ken; Japanese pronunciation: [kaꜜi i.nɯ], also called the Tora Inu or Tiger Dog) is a breed of dog native to the Kai region, Yamanashi Prefecture, Japan, where it is a national monument. It is a rare dog even in its native land and is one of the six native Japanese dog breeds protected by the Nihon Ken Hozonkai.

== Appearance ==
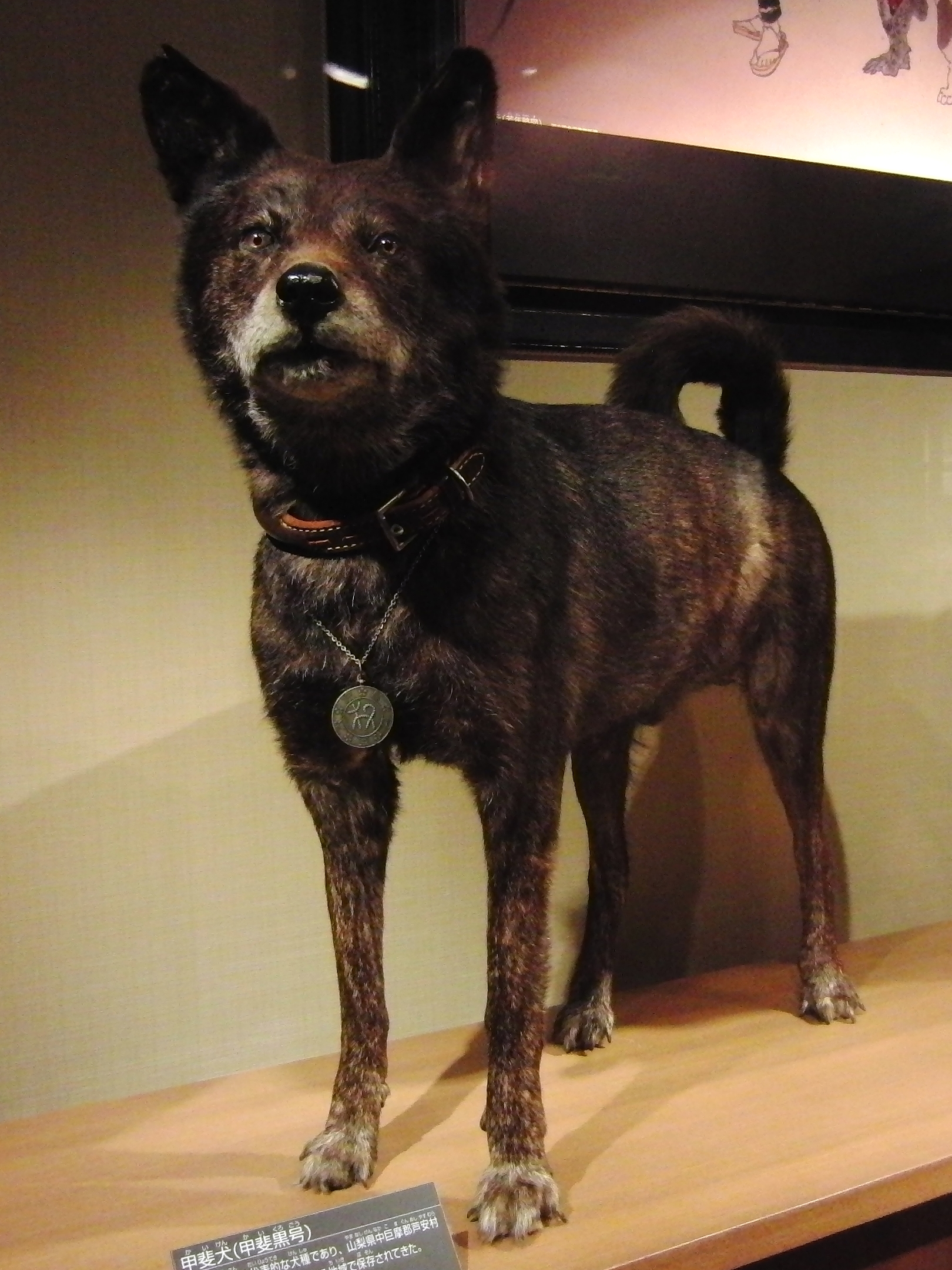
Stuffed specimen of Kai Ken named "Kai-kuro-go" at the National Museum of Nature and Science, Tokyo, Japan

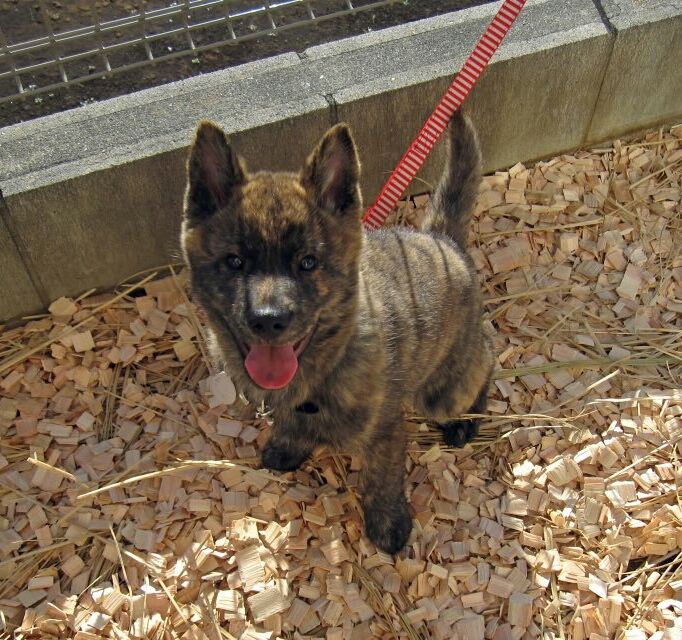
Kai Ken puppy

The Kai Ken is a medium-sized dog with a wedge shaped head and prick ears. Males are typically 18 to 22 inches at the shoulder, while the females are slightly smaller, 17 to 20 inches at the shoulder. The tail may be curled over the back, or carried in a sickle position. Limbs should be strong and hocks should be well developed reflecting the dogs’ history of mountain life. The coat is of harsh texture, medium length, and comes in various shades of brindle ("tiger" stripes). There are three main recognized shades of brindle: the Aka-tora (red), Chu-tora (middle), and Kuro-tora (black). Puppies are born a solid color, and their brindle markings develop as they age, sometimes taking as long as five years before fully showing.

== Temperament ==
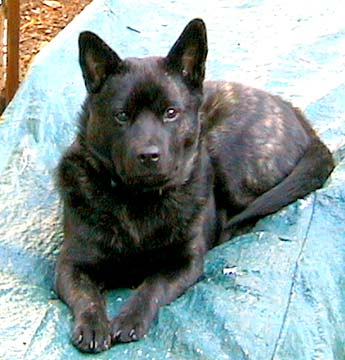
Kuro-tora Kai Ken

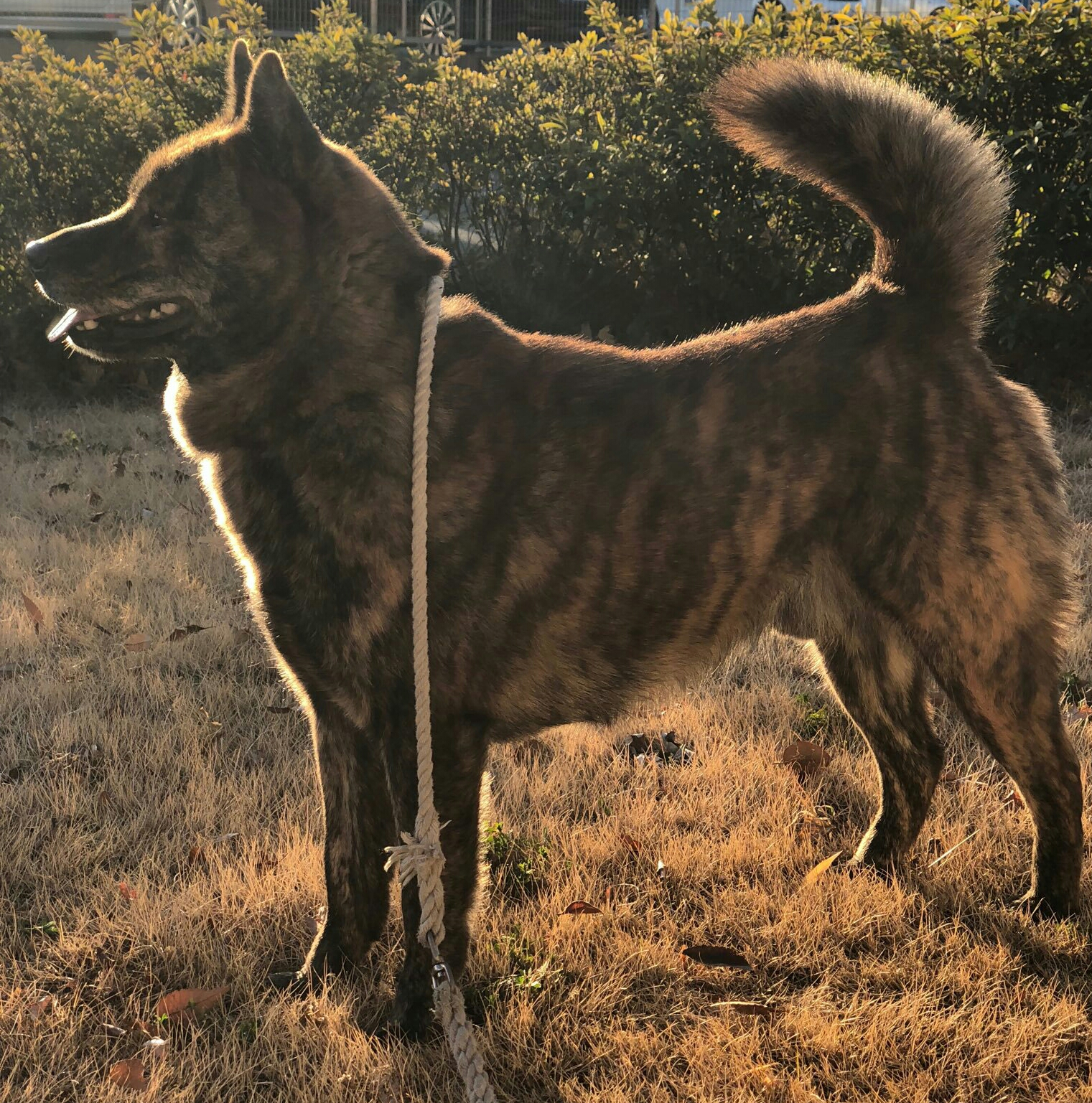
Chu-tora Kai Ken

The Kai Ken is intelligent, agile, alert and brave. They are natural hunters and make good watch dogs, being reserved with strangers but loyal to their families. They are friendly, often good with children and are not usually aggressive towards other dogs. Many love to swim, and have been known to cross rivers and climb trees while chasing their prey.

== History ==
The Kai Ken was split off from the Nihon Ken (Japanese Dog) landrace during the creation of the Nihon Ken Hozonkai (NIPPO) and named after Kai Province in Yamanashi Prefecture where the breed is said to have originated.

Being an agile and effortless climber, the Kai Ken was used to hunt in steep mountainous terrain in Yamanashi where its primary quarry was the Japanese serow (Kamoshika), deer, wild boar, and occasionally bear.

After the creation of NIPPO in 1928, the Kai Ken was designated a national monument in Japan in 1933. In 1931 the Kai Ken Aigokai (KKA) was formed and became the primary Preservation Society for the breed in Japan and still is today.

== In popular culture ==
- Many Kai Kens play important roles in the Yoshihiro Takahashi's series Silver Fang and its sequel, Weed, including the brothers Kurotora, Chūtora, and Akatora. In the sequel, Ginga Densetsu Weed, Kurotora's son, Kagetora, stars as an important character, with his less prominently featured brothers, Harutora and Nobutora, and cousins Dodo, Buru, Shōji, and Shigure.
- Another Yoshihiro Takahashi's manga, Kacchū no Senshi Gamu featured a villainous Kai Ken named Gama.
- Chu, a Canine Warrior from the 2006 video game Ōkami, is also a Kai Ken.
- Oswald "Ozzy" (played by Little Bear), a 600 year old magic dog in the movie The Amazing Wizard of Paws from 2015 by director Bryan Michael Stoller.
- Rover, a large dog monster who becomes the main character's pet later in the series, in One-Punch Man is based on a Kai Ken.
- The mascot of Yamanashi Prefecture in Central Japan, Takeda Hishimaru (武田菱丸), is a Kai Ken samurai based on the historical figure of Takeda Shingen.

== See also ==
- List of dog breeds
- Japan Kennel Club
- Koyasu Inu
