= Hokkaido (dog breed) =

Japanese breed of dog

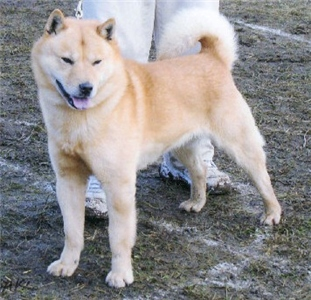
- Other names: Hokkaido-Inu; Dō-ken; Ainu-ken; Seta; Ainu dog; Hokkaido-Ken
- Origin: Japan
Traits
| Height | Males | 19.1–20.3 in (48.5–51.5 cm) |
| | Females | 17.9–19.1 in (45.5–48.5 cm) |
- Color: sesame, brindle, red, black, black and tan, white
Kennel club standards
- Japan Kennel Club: standard
- Fédération Cynologique Internationale: standard

The Hokkaido (北海道犬, Hokkaidō Inu, Hokkaidō-ken; Japanese pronunciation: [hok.kai.doꜜː i.nɯ]) is a breed of dog originating from Japan. Other names for the breed include Ainu-ken, Seta, Ainu dog, and (in Japan) its name is sometimes shortened to Dō-ken (道犬). The Hokkaido is native to the prefecture of the same name in Japan.

== Appearance ==
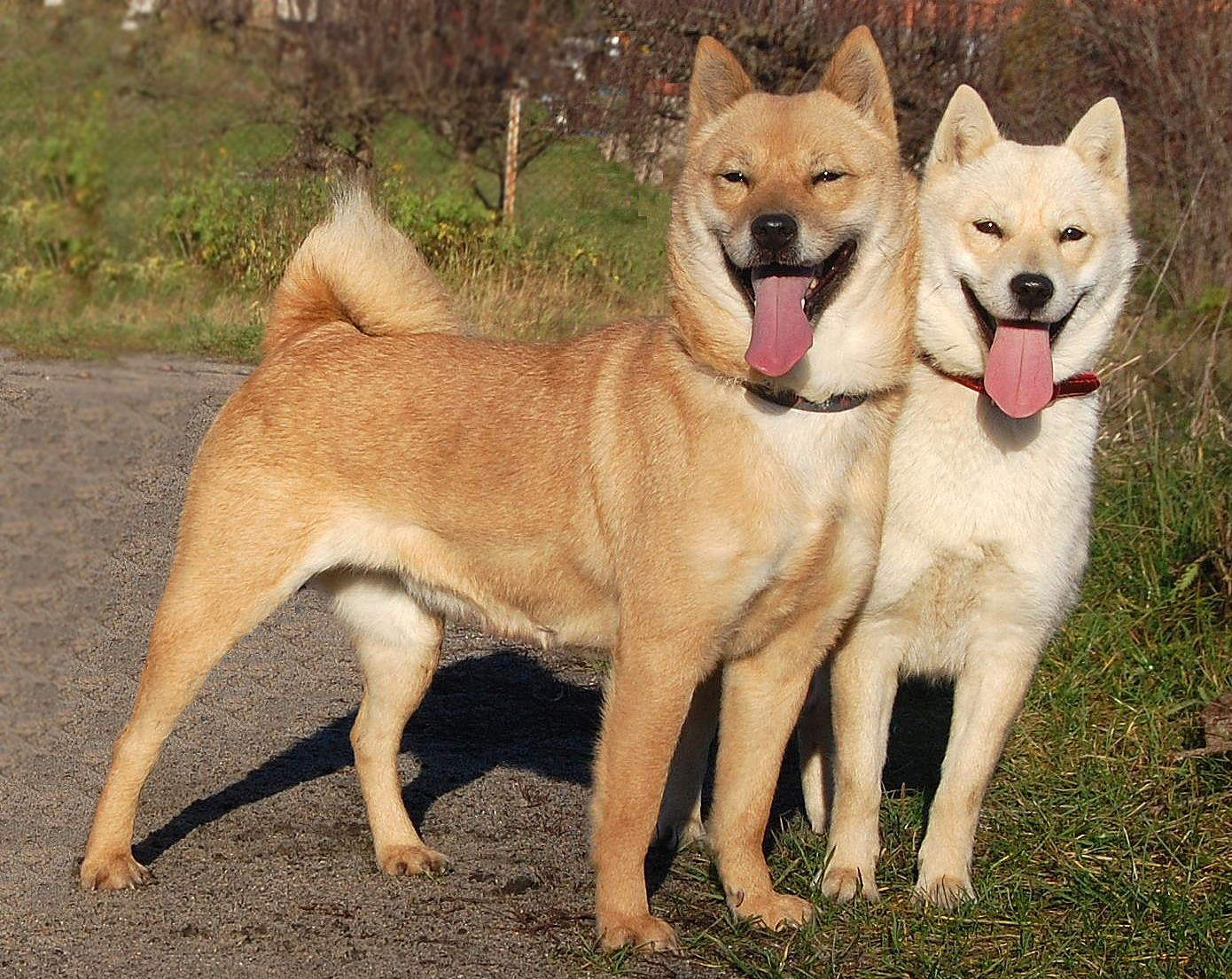
Two dogs

The dog is medium in size, with small, triangular, upright ears. The small black eyes have a rising triangular outline. The Hokkaido has a coat of long, stiff fur, and a second, shorter coat of soft fur. Colors include red, white, black, brindle, sesame, black and tan, and wolf-gray. Males are typically 50 cm (20 in) tall at the withers, females slightly shorter, with body masses in the 20 kg (44 lb) range. Dogs bred on continents outside of their native Japan may be smaller.

== Health ==
The Hokkaido dog has a very high rate of Collie eye anomaly (CEA). About 1/3 of Hokkaidos are affected by CEA while 2/3 are carriers.

== History and lineage ==
All native Japanese dogs, including the Hokkaido, are believed to originate from dogs brought to Japan during the Jomon period. The Hokkaido is believed to originate from the medium-sized dogs brought by immigrants from the main island of Honshu in the 1140s. In 1869, the English zoologist Thomas W. Blakiston gave the breed the name "Hokkaido". The breed was useful in the search for survivors of an Imperial Japanese Army regiment that was caught in heavy snow crossing the Hakkōda Mountains of Aomori Prefecture in 1902.

In 1937, the Ainu dog was designated in Japan as "a Living natural Monument" and "a rare species protected by law" by the Ministry of Education and it was decided that the official name of the breed would be Hokkaido-Inu. However, the dogs are almost always called Hokkaido-Ken among the Japanese people.

The breed is extremely rare outside its native country.

== Works cited ==
- Anderson, Brad (February 2012). Vladimir Beregovoy (ed.). "The Nihon Ken" (PDF). Journal of the International Society for the Preservation of Primitive Aboriginal Dogs (30): 4–54. Archived (PDF) from the original on 19 January 2023.
- "FCI Breed Standard" (PDF). Fédération Cynologique Internationale. 9 February 2017. Archived (PDF) from the original on 22 July 2024.
- Mizukami, K.; Yabuki, A.; Endoh, D.; Chang, H. S.; Lee, K. W.; Nakayama, M.; Kushida, K.; Kohyama, M.; Lee, J. I.; Yamato, O. (17 June 2014). "An investigation of parallel and simultaneous selection for collie eye anomaly and ivermectin toxicosis". Veterinary Record. 175 (7): 174–176. doi:10.1136/vr.102015. PMID 24939474. S2CID 37801535.
- Tanabe, Yuichi (2006). "Phylogenetic studies of dogs with emphasis on Japanese and Asian breeds". Proceedings of the Japan Academy. Ser. B: Physical and Biological Sciences. 82 (10): 375–387. Archived from the original on 27 July 2023.
