= Kishu =

Kishu Ken
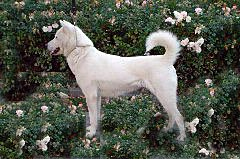
- Other names: Kishu Ken; Kishu Inu; Taichi Ken; Kumano Ken
- Origin: Japan
Traits
- Height: 17–22 in (43–56 cm)
- Weight: 30–60 lb (14–27 kg)
- Colour: black & tan, red, sesame, white (most prevalent)
Kennel club standards
- Japan Kennel Club: standard
- Fédération Cynologique Internationale: standard

The Kishu (紀州犬, Kishū Inu, Kishū-ken; Japanese pronunciation: [kʲi̥.ɕɯꜜː i.nɯ]) is a Japanese breed of dog. It is descended from ancient medium-sized breeds and named after the Kishu region, now Mie Prefecture and Wakayama Prefecture. It was designated a living national monument of Japan in 1934. Kishu have been prized since prehistoric times for boar and deer hunting. Like the Shiba, they are often quiet. Kishu will stalk prey quietly rather than bark. They are the most commonly used purebred native Japanese breed used for hunting boar to this day.

== History ==
One legend from the Kii peninsula states that the first boar dog, and the progenitor to the Kishu breed, was a Honshu Wolf pup gifted to a hunter when he showed compassion for an injured she-wolf. This tale varies based on the telling, but the impact of this story on the Kishu breed persists today: many Kishu dogs include the word "wolf" in their names.

Kishu Ken were selectively bred for the hunting of wild boar and deer in the mountainous Mie prefecture and Wakayama prefecture. The Kishu Ken were identified in a study in the 1930s carried out by a Japanese breeder, Haruo Isogai, which classified all native Japanese dog breeds into three categories: large-, medium-, and small-sized. The Kishu Ken belongs to the medium-sized dog group. The breed was not standardized until 1934 and was composed of the dogs collected from that area. When the breed first started, approximately 70% of individuals were said to be non-white. However, white is now the predominant color. The popularity of a primarily white line of Kishu Ken spread the gene responsible for white through the genepool and turned the Kishu Ken into the mostly-white breed it is today.

The primary registries today include the Japan Kennel Club (JKC) and Nihon Ken Hozonkai (NIPPO). The Nihon Ken Hozonkai is considered the main registry of the breed in its parent country and is responsible for the original breed standard. The Kishu has been recognized as a living natural monument in Japan since 1934. Since the breed is so rare, one might only ever see it in its native homeland, Japan. Even in Japan, the Kishu's numbers are in rapid decline, and without dedicated enthusiasts, the breed may soon disappear. The Kishu is listed as a Foundation Stock breed with the American Kennel Club. The National Kishu Ken Club became the official parent club of the Kishu Ken in the United States in 2022. The Kishu Ken was moved from Working Group to Hound Group to recognize its function and history in 2023.

== Characteristics ==
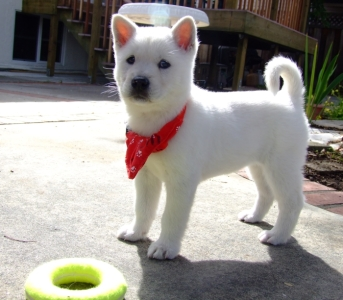

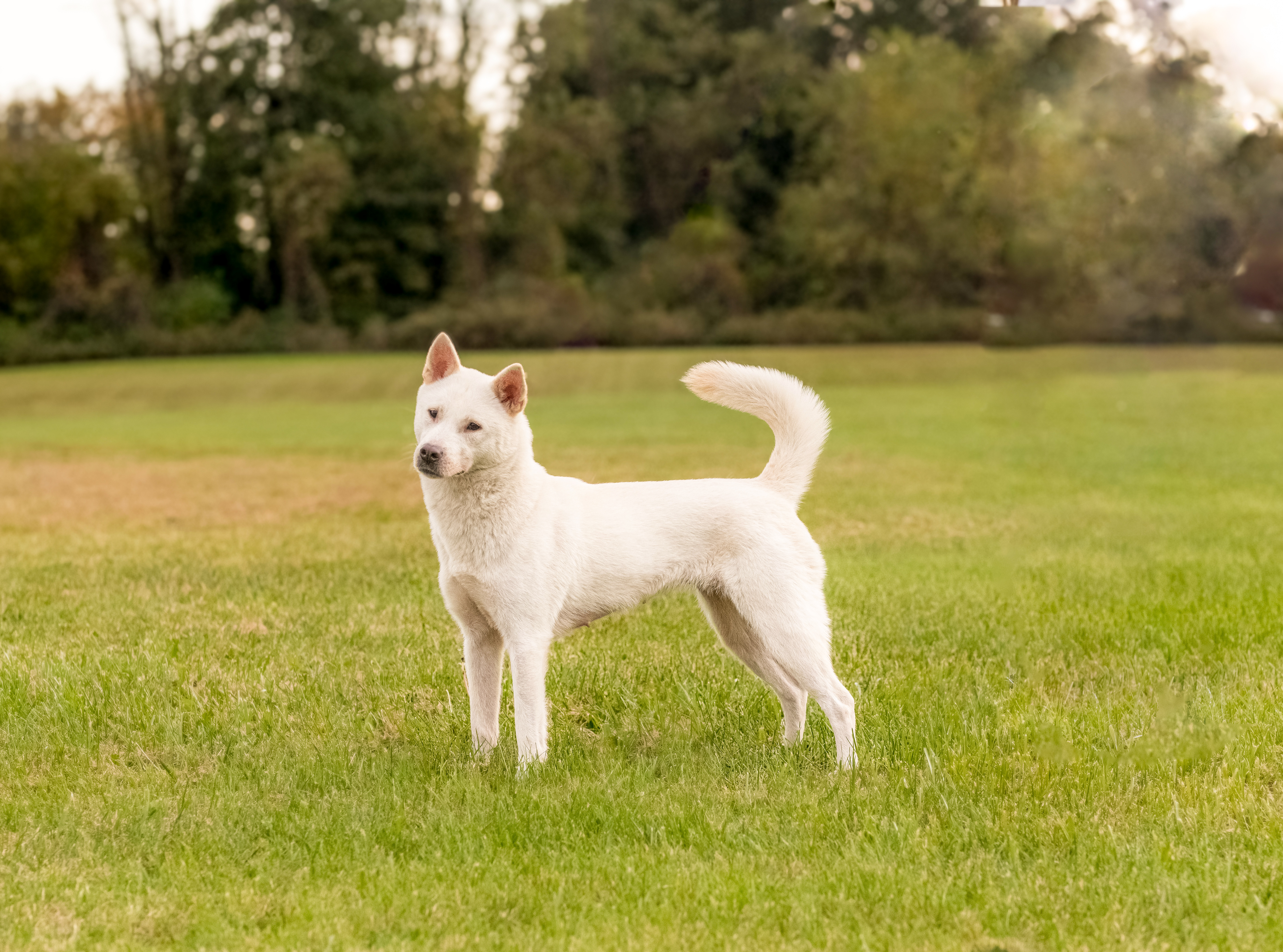
2.5 y/o Female Kishu Ken

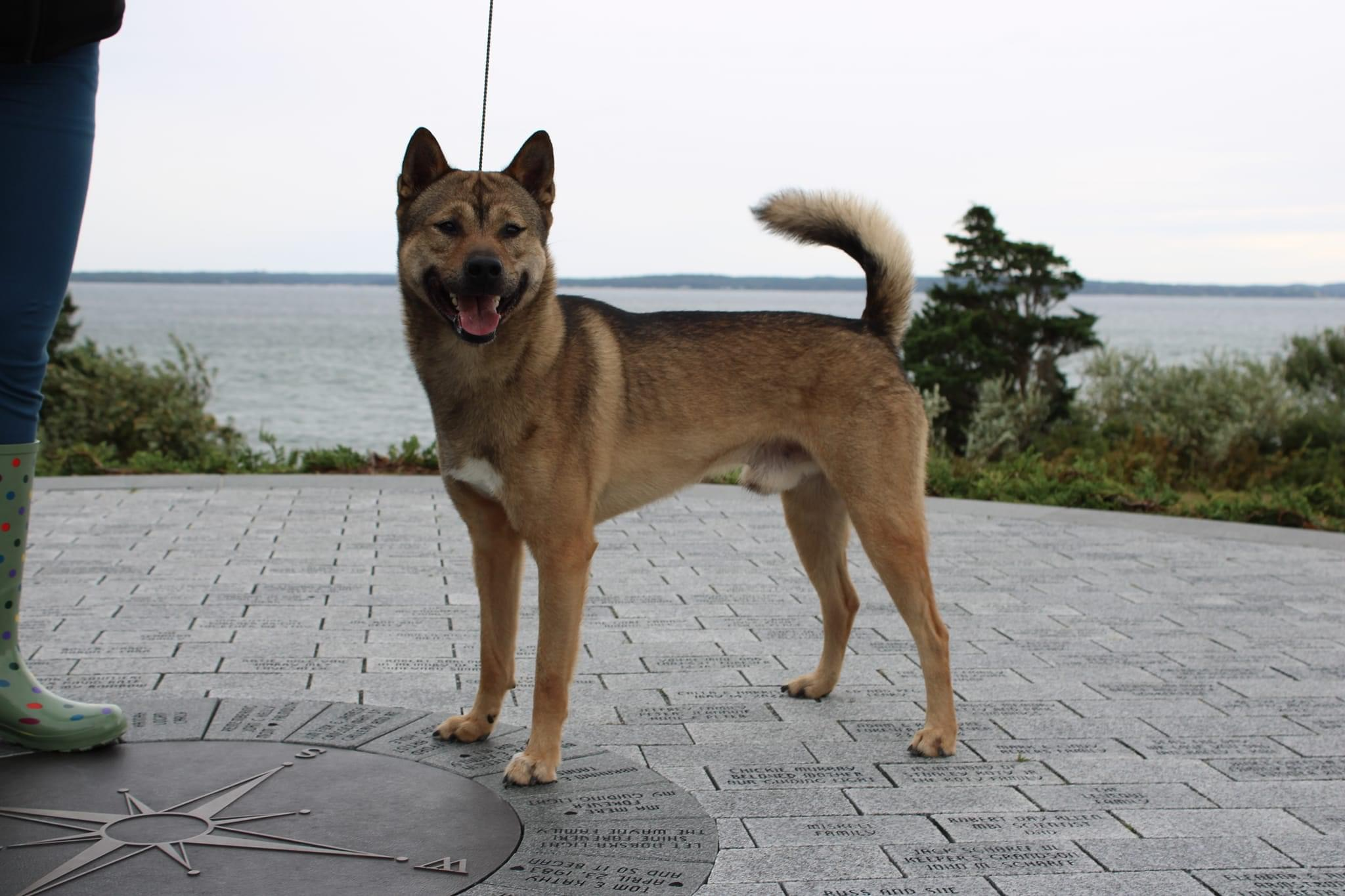
4 y/o Yuushoku Male

=== Appearance ===
The Kishu stands 17-22 inches (43–55 cm) tall, averages 30–60 pounds and is considered a medium-sized dog. The standard only permits solid colored dogs to be shown. Accepted show colors are white, sesame, red, and black & tan (NIPPO only). White is the most common and preferred coat color, as it made the dogs easier to distinguish from prey so the hunter did not accidentally shoot them. The nose color is black, but with the white coats, flesh-colored noses are permitted. The bite is either scissor or a level bite. The tail is either carried in a sickle or curled over the back. The coat is short, straight, and coarse with a thick undercoat. There is fringe on the cheeks and tail. The ears incline forward and are smaller rather than larger, but should maintain proportion with the head and dog overall. This breed is tough, agile and friendly. The eyes should be clam shaped, with a slight arc from the inner corner to the outer corner.

=== Temperament ===
Kishu Ken often gravitate towards one person in the family, but a properly socialized dog should range from aloof to outgoing. They are courageous and brave as hunters, and will be loyal to their owners. They have a strong prey drive, and will hunt when given the opportunity. A few have been known to do well with cats if raised with them. They do well with other dogs if socialized well as puppies; however, Kishu may become combative with other dogs who do not respect their boundaries, or become combative with other dogs when frustrated. They are quite headstrong and willful, making training necessary, but they are devoted and loyal to family, getting along well with children, if raised with them. Kishu Ken like to keep an eye on whatever is going on, and sometimes find a high place to look out from. They can be aloof or shy around strangers. They are easily housebroken, intelligent, and strong willed.

== Health ==
The Kishu Ken is a fairly healthy dog breed that does not suffer from health conditions common to more popular and refined breeds, but there is still very limited data on the breed in or out of its country of origin. Current data through the public Finnish health database KoiraNet suggests that the Kishu Ken may not be as prone to joint deformities as its sibling breeds, where the majority of tested Kishu Ken have been evaluated as having deformity-free hip joints. Elbows have, thus far, had the least favorable evaluations in the Kishu Ken, and elbow dysplasia may be something to screen for in Kishu Ken as more breed-specific data becomes available.

Instead of physical deformities that cause health issues, Kishu Ken appear to be prone to allergies and autoimmune illnesses or skin conditions. These are not typically life-threatening, but can require lifelong treatment through regulated diet, environmental awareness, allergy medication, or even steroids depending on the individual. Allergies to grass and dust mites have had particular mention among Kishu Ken owners. Autoimmune conditions vary, but a handful of individuals have an allergy-like immune response that causes sores and dermatitis which often responds to and is treated with common steroids. Addison's Disease is also noted in the breed, which is an autoimmune condition that causes an error in hormone production in the adrenal glands. Hypothyroidism is also sometimes observed. In dogs, the most common form of hypothyroidism is caused by an autoimmune condition, and the Kishu may be at particular risk due to the overall autoimmune condition in the breed.

Eyes are another moderate concern in Kishu Ken. The most common deformity of the eye is known as Persistent Pupillary Membranes according to the Finnish health database. This may or may not cause vision impairment, and each dog must be evaluated on a case-by-case basis by a simple eye test. This is not a life-threatening disease and typically requires no treatment. The other known issue is entropion, a genetic defect affecting the eye in which the eyelid turns inward and the lashes scratch the eyeball. This is likely connected in part to the triangular shape of the eye in the Kishu Ken. Entropion requires surgery to prevent the loss of vision in the eye and continual pain to the dog. Recently, juvenile cataracts have been seen in the breed.

The AKC Kishu Ken parent club has submitted the Kishu Ken to the Orthopedic Foundation for Animals (OFA) for their CHIC (Canine Health Information Center) program. Recommending screenings for breeding Kishu Ken are eyes, thyroid, dentition, DNA banking, and joints.

=== Grooming ===
The Kishu may be brushed to keep their fur clean and free from impacted undercoat, but their stiff topcoat should shed dirt very easily, even when wet and muddy. Bathe them as necessary, depending on owner preference. Their ears should be checked routinely for wax build up, infection or dirt. Their nails should also be trimmed regularly. Kishu Kens shed once or twice a year, making grooming at these times needed.

=== Exercise ===
The Kishu needs adequate space to roam and exercise, meaning a house with a yard or urban environment with a fence. They need regular exercise on a leash, taking walks or runs. They can also be given a job to do such as hunting to satisfy their exercise.

== Roles ==
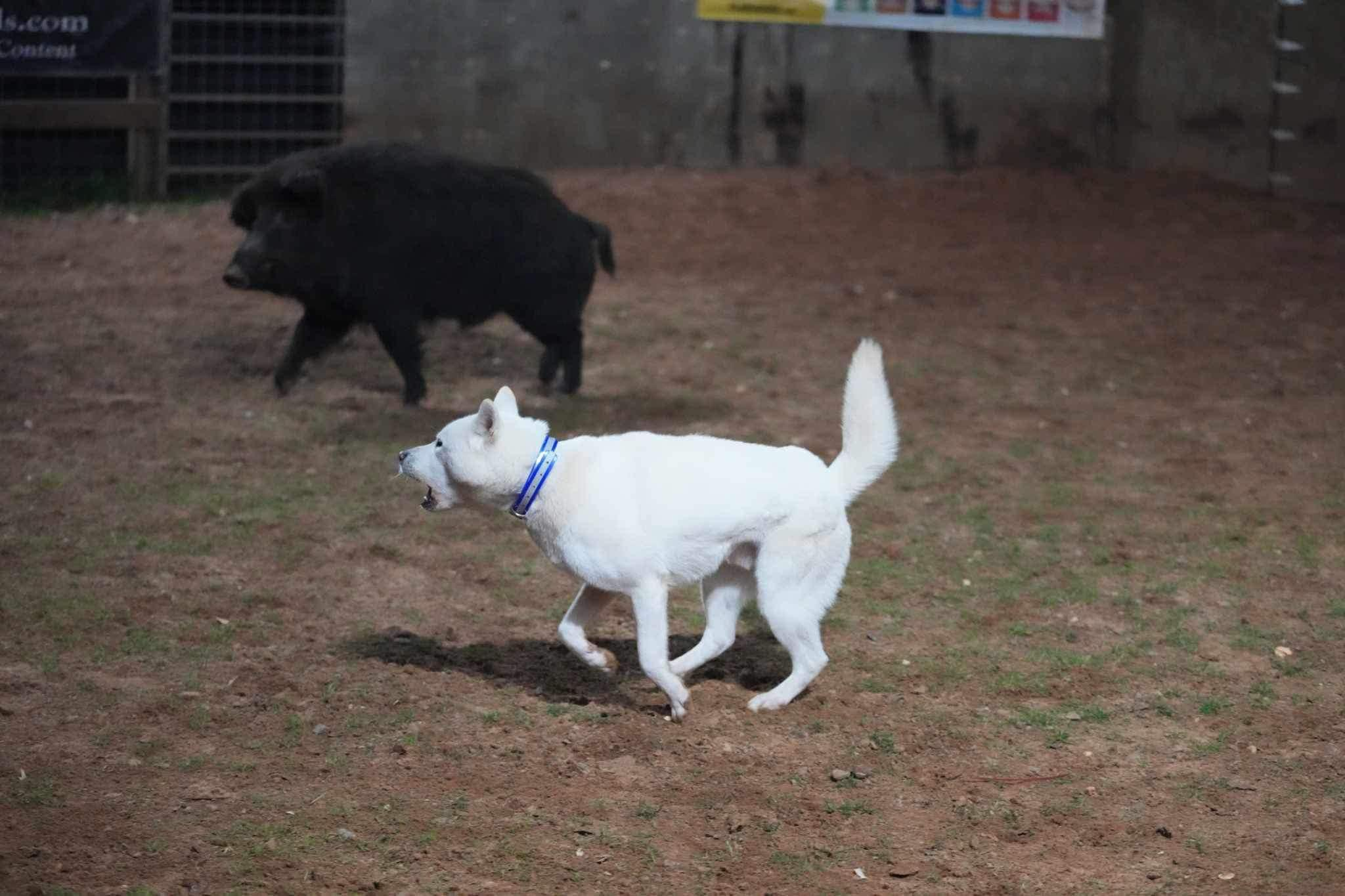
3 y/o Male Kishu Ken at Hog Bay

The traditional hunting method used with Kishu is called "one gun, one dog", where a single hunter and their dog stalk boar. As subsistent hunting has decreased, Kishu have transitioned to other venues. Kishu Ken do well in any venue that requires a strong bond with their owner and utilizes their natural drive to work and hunt. These venues to name a few may include hog bays, lure coursing, barn hunt, obedience, rally, and agility competitions due to their intelligence and strong athleticism.

== In popular culture ==
- The works of manga artist Yoshihiro Takahashi feature many Kishu, characterizing them as skilled fighters.
- Akame of Ginga: Nagareboshi Gin
- Kyōshirō of Ginga Legend Weed. Also Sakura, the main character's mother, was a Kishu. This makes Weed, the main character, a Kishu/Akita mix—his father Gin was an Akita Inu.
- Gamu, Kusakage, Shiba, Tsuchigumo, Oboro, and Honō, the Ganin warriors of Kacchū no Senshi Gamu.

== See also ==
- List of dog breeds
- Awa Inu
- Japan Kennel Club
- Nihon Ken Hozonkai
