= Japan Kennel Club =

- Abbreviation: JKC
- Formation: 1949; 77 years ago
- Type: Kennel club
- Region served: Japan
- Official language: Japanese
- Website: www.jkc.or.jp

The Japan Kennel Club (ジャパンケネルクラブ, Japan Keneru Kurabu) is the primary registry body for purebred dog pedigrees in Japan.

It hosts the FCI (Fédération Cynologique Internationale) Japan International Dog Show held annually at the Tokyo Big Sight; the event also includes two grooming competitions, with the highest award regarded as the "best in Japan" title.

Other than conformation shows, the JKC promotes obedience trials for purebred dogs and confers championship and other titles in obedience and similar competitions; the JKC also certifies and examines groomers, trainers and other dog-related professionals. It also administers tests and certifies rescue dogs, as well as host rescue dog competitions.

== History ==
The precursor to the organization, the Japan Guard Dog Association (全日本警備犬協会, Zen Nihon keibi ken kyokai) was formed in 1949; this then became the Japan Kennel Club (ジャパン・ケンネル・クラブ, Japan kenneru kurabu) in 1952. The Club became a member of the Fédération Cynologique Internationale (World Canine Federation) in 1979. The Japanese name was amended to Japan keneru kurabu (ジャパンケネルクラブ) in 1999.

== See also ==
- Nihon Ken Hozonkai
