= Cheems =

Hong Kong dog and Internet meme celebrity (2011–2023)

Balltze; 波子
- Photograph of Balltze taken in 2017, used in the Cheems meme since 2019
- Species: Canis familiaris
- Breed: Shiba Inu
- Sex: Male
- Born: 9 January 2011; Hong Kong
- Died: 18 August 2023 (aged 12); Hong Kong
- Cause of death: Cancer
- Years active: 2019–2023
- Known for: Internet celebrity
- Owner: Kathy
- Residence: Kowloon, Hong Kong
- Named after: Ramune

Chinese name
- Chinese: 波子
- Literal meaning: Small ball
Transcriptions
Standard Mandarin
- Hanyu Pinyin: Bōzǐ
- Bopomofo: ㄅㄛ ㄗˇ
- Gwoyeu Romatzyh: Botzyy
- Wade–Giles: Po-tzu
Yue: Cantonese
- Yale Romanization: Bō-jí
- Jyutping: Bo^{1}-zi^{2}

Ball Ball
- Chinese: 波波
Transcriptions
Standard Mandarin
- Hanyu Pinyin: Bōbō
Yue: Cantonese
- Yale Romanization: Bōbō
- Jyutping: bo1 bo1

Balltze (Chinese: 波子, 9 January 2011 – 18 August 2023), nicknamed Cheems in online memes, was a Shiba Inu from Hong Kong. He was called Ball Ball (Chinese: 波波; Cantonese Yale: Bōbō) by his owners.

== Biography ==
Balltze was born on 9 January 2011. He was adopted at the age of one from an emigrating friend, by fashion designer Kathy from Kowloon. Kathy's brother named him after Ramune, a Japanese beverage in which a marble ball inside the bottle is pressed down to let the drink flow. He was known as Ball Ball by his owners.

In May 2022, Balltze was diagnosed with pancreatitis. He recovered in June. In May 2023, his owners reported that he had serious respiratory problems. He had cancer and was undergoing thoracentesis (the draining of fluid from his chest) when he died on 18 August 2023, aged 12. His funeral was held on 23 August, and donations of US$13,000 were sent to local animal charities.

In a 2020 interview with Know Your Meme, Kathy said that Balltze wanted his legacy to be "Meme fade, [fellow Shiba Inu meme] Doge is eternal. Remember me as 'Balltze', not 'Cheems' or 'cheemsburger', I'm just a Balltze".

After Balltze's death, Kathy adopted a new Shiba Inu named Pochita on 3 October 2024. Pochita was named after the protagonist of the manga Chainsaw Man for being strong and sweet.

== Memes ==
Balltze appears as the Internet meme character Cheems, whose name comes from his taste for "cheemsburgers" [sic]. The character adds the letter "m" into words as he speaks. The meme was first posted to the r/dogelore subreddit on Reddit in June 2019. The image used for the meme was uploaded originally on Balltze's Instagram account on 4 September 2017, and shows him sitting on the floor.

Cheems also features in the "Swole Doge vs Cheems" meme in which a muscular version of Doge represents something considered better in the past, and Cheems represents its current, lesser state. The meme became viral in mid-2020, during the COVID-19 pandemic. In another meme format, Godzilla and King Kong represent two competing concepts, while Cheems armed with a baseball bat is the winning third concept, chasing the other two away.

In 2020, another meme circulated, in which Cheems hits another dog with a baseball bat causing the onomatopoeia "bonk", while saying "go to horny jail"; the meme is posted in response to sexually suggestive messages. The Guardian journalist Caleb Quinley noted this image in protests against the 2021 Myanmar coup d'état. Cheems appeared in several other memes in the Spanish-speaking world, including saying "no puede ser" ("It cannot be") and "me da amsiedad" ("It gives me amxiety" [sic]). In 2021, Spain's public broadcaster RTVE wrote "What is clear is that a meme is worth more than a thousand words and Cheems and Doge now form part of Internet popular culture, reinventing themselves constantly to brighten our days or put us in our places". Balltze's owner Kathy's favourite Cheems meme was one in Spanish, in which he takes a bath and says "Could you carry on scrolling? It's just that I'm taking a bamth [sic]".

Kathy initially did not understand the Cheems memes for their absurdist nature. She later signed deals with a management company and an American toy company, as well as making T-shirts which benefitted local canine charities.

Balltze inspired the Cheems (CHEEMS) cryptocurrency as well as a number of "wannabe dog-themed coins" competing against Dogecoin and the Shiba Inu cryptocurrency according to Parth Dubey of the International Business Times.

In August 2024, the Museo de Cheems (Cheems Museum) opened in Mexico City, exhibiting paintings depicting Cheems in contexts related to art and literature.

== See also ==
- Kabosu
- DoggoLingo
