= Woofer (disambiguation) =

A woofer is a large loudspeaker driver.

Woofer may also refer to:

- Bob Davis (Australian rules footballer)
- Wilderness First Responder, an individual trained in first aid
- WWOOFer, a WWOOF (Willing Workers on Organic Farms) volunteer
- A slang term for dog in DoggoLingo
