= Doge-1 =

Mission to launch a satellite into the orbit of the moon, paid for by cryptocurrency

DOGE-1 is a CubeSat mission planned by Geometric Energy Corporation. The mission is being paid for entirely with the cryptocurrency Dogecoin, which is known for its popular "Doge" meme. DOGE-1 is being developed by Geometric Energy Corporation, which announced the project in May 2021. The satellite will be launched aboard a SpaceX Falcon 9 rocket and will be used to collect "lunar-spatial intelligence" using onboard sensors and a camera. Mission to launch a small (40 kg) satellite into lunar orbit to explore the Moon and display images and digital art on a small screen on lunar orbiter that will be broadcast back to Earth. According to Samuel Reid, a miniature screen on the DOGE-1 satellite will display advertisements, images and logos, which will subsequently be broadcast to the Earth.

== Purpose ==
DOGE-1 CubeSat is a small, lightweight satellite that will be equipped with sensors and cameras to capture images and data of the lunar surface in order to improve our understanding of the lunar geology, environment and potential resources. The main purpose of Doge-1 is to broadcast advertisements, logos and images on the screen of the Doge-1 satellite, which will be orbiting the Moon. Screen images will be captured by installed cameras and broadcast to Earth, from where they will be streamed to Twitch and YouTube platforms.

== Space billboard ==
DOGE-1 includes a space billboard that hosts ad images that are then taken by a satellite-mounted camera and broadcast to Earth. The DOGE-1 display is controlled using Xi Protocol tokens, which can be purchased on various cryptocurrency exchanges. In structure, this may resemble an artboard, such as The Million Dollar Homepage or r/place.

== Launch date ==
The launch of DOGE-1 was announced by Elon Musk on Twitter on May 9, 2021 as a rideshare on the Nova-C/IM-1 mission, a joint mission between Intuitive Machines and NASA. The Nova-C IM-1 mission has been repeatedly postponed by Intuitive Machines' launch provider SpaceX, which has also postponed the launch of DOGE-1. As of February 2026, the cubesat was tentatively scheduled to launch on September 13, 2026.
