= Dabloons =

TikTok role-playing game

An image of a cat with an outstretched paw with the superimposed caption "4 dabloons", which became a viral TikTok meme that spawned the Dabloons trend

Dabloons is a collaborative online role-playing game and Internet meme that became popular on TikTok in November 2022. Within the game, participants collect and spend an imaginary currency called "dabloons" via "encounters" with videos featuring cats as merchants or other characters. Its name comes from doubloon, a Spanish gold coin.

The Internet trend started from an image of a cat with an outstretched paw, which was posted to Instagram in April 2021 with the caption "4 dabloons". Players kept track of their own dabloons balances, and TikTok's recommendation algorithm also supplied personalized encounters to players. Users also collaboratively added thieves, lotteries, government agencies, and rival factions to the game.

Large dabloons giveaways led to fictional hyperinflation, rising prices, and debt. The fictional economy of dabloons was analyzed in a 2026 study in the journal Convergence.

== See also ==
- Cats and the Internet
