= Shiba Inu =

Japanese dog breed

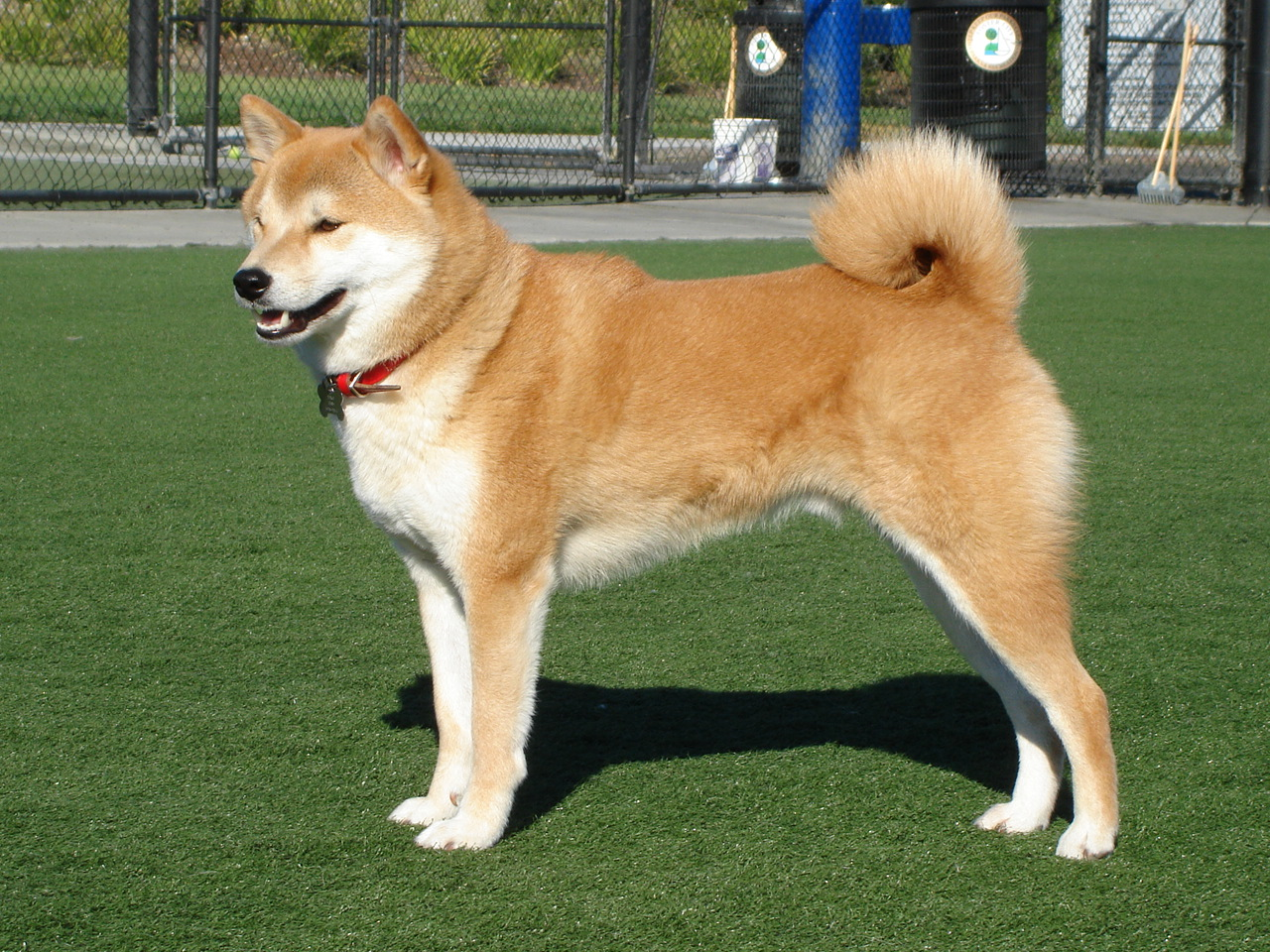
- Standard/red-colored Shiba Inu
- Other names: Japanese Shiba Inu; Japanese Brushwood Dog; Small Brushwood Dog; Shiba
- Common nicknames: Shibe
- Origin: Japan
Traits
Height	Males	38 to 41 cm (15 to 16 in)
	Females	35 to 38 cm (14 to 15 in)
Weight	Males	10 kg (22 lb)
	Females	8 kg (18 lb)
- Coat: double
- Color: Red, black and tan, cream, sesame, black sesame, red sesame
- Litter size: 3 puppies on average
Kennel club standards
- Japan Kennel Club: standard
- American Kennel Club: standard
- Fédération Cynologique Internationale: standard

Shiba Inu
- "Shiba Inu" in kanji

Japanese name
- Kanji: 柴犬
- Kana: しば いぬ
Transcriptions
- Romanization: shiba inu

The Shiba Inu (Japanese: 柴犬; Japanese pronunciation: [ɕi.ba.i.nɯ]) is a breed of hunting dog from Japan. A small-to-medium breed, it is the smallest of the six original dog breeds native to Japan. The Shiba Inu was originally bred for hunting. Its name literally translates to "brushwood dog", as it is used to flush game.

The Shiba Inu is a small, alert, and agile dog that copes well with mountainous terrain and hiking trails. Its appearance is similar to other Japanese dog breeds such as the Akita Inu or Hokkaido, but the Shiba Inu is a different breed with a distinct bloodline, temperament, and smaller size than other Japanese dog breeds.

== Appearance ==
The breed's standard colors are red, sesame and black and tan.

All have a cream to white ventral color, known as urajiro (裏白). Urajiro literally translates to "underside white". The urajiro is required in the following areas on all coat colors: on the sides of the muzzle, on the cheeks, inside the ears, on the underjaw and upper throat, on the forechest and chest, inside of the legs, on the abdomen, around the vent and the ventral side of the tail. In black and tan as well as sesame Shiba the urajiro on the fore chest commonly appears as a triangular mark on both sides of the fore chest, taking the shape of a bow tie.

Other than in the urajiro areas, a cream coat is considered a "major fault" by the Japan Kennel Club, American Kennel Club and the FCI. It is not intentionally bred, as the required markings are not discernible. However, a cream coat is acceptable according to The Kennel Club (UK) breed standard.

Shiba Inu have a double coat; the topcoat is stiff with guard hairs and the undercoat is soft and plush. Although less common, Shiba Inu can also be long-haired as a result of inheriting the recessive gene from both parents.

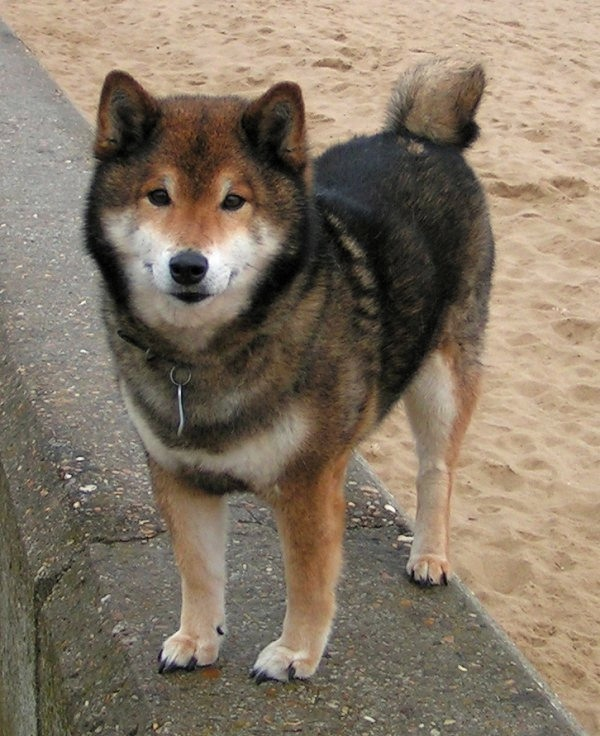
A sesame Shiba Inu

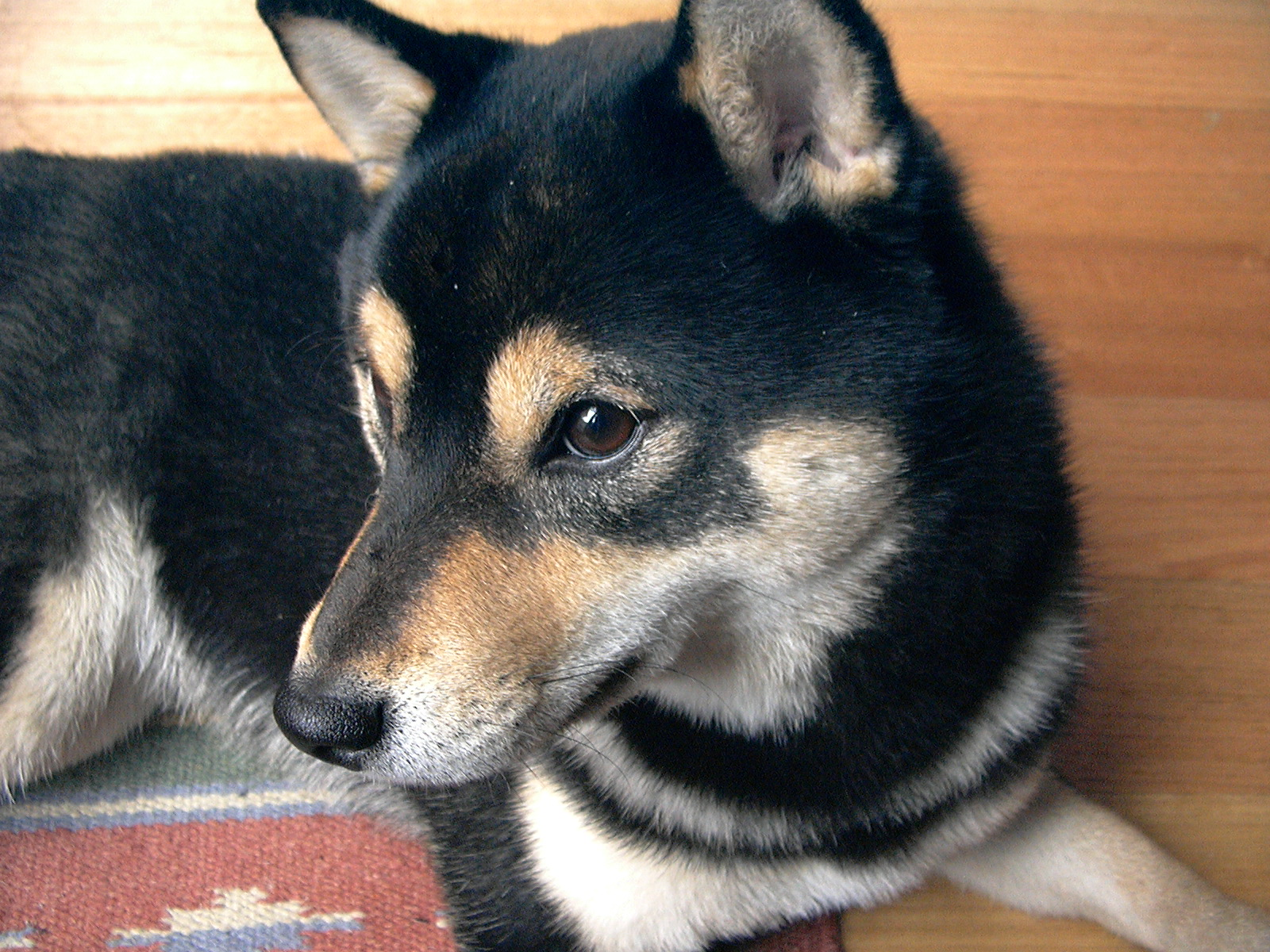
A black and tan Shiba Inu with urajiro markings

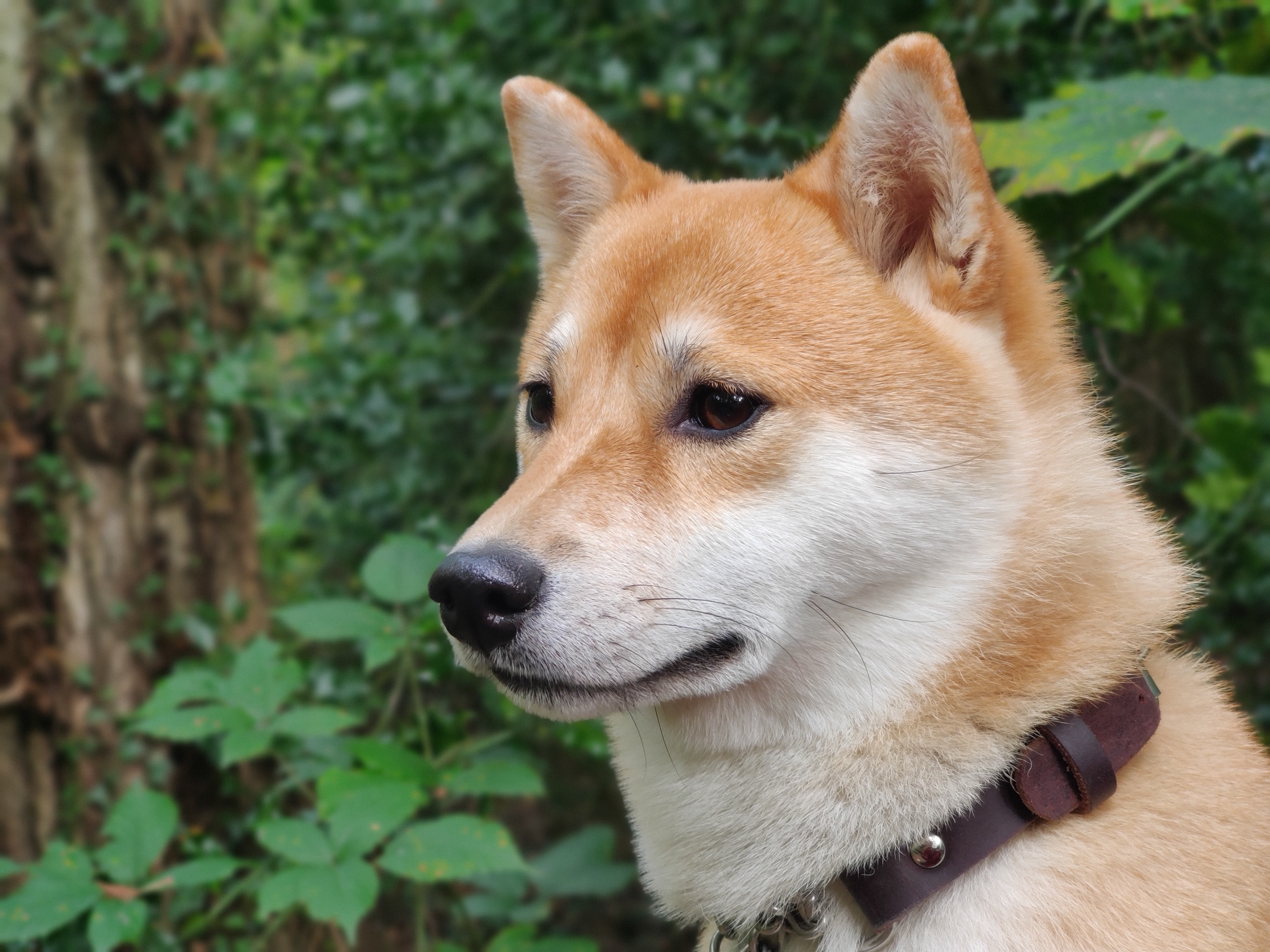
A red Shiba Inu with visible urajiro markings on the muzzle, cheeks, ears and throat

== Temperament ==
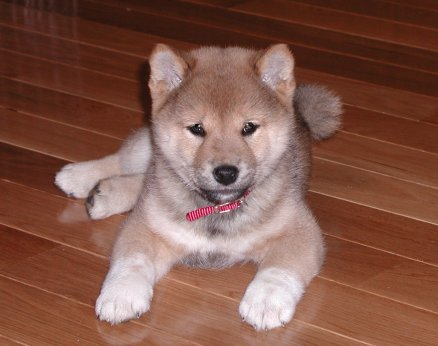
A Shiba Inu puppy

The Shiba Inu is considered an alert, affectionate, and independent breed with high intelligence but also somewhat stubborn and strong-willed.

The terms "spirited boldness" (悍威, kan'i), "good nature" (良性, ryōsei), and "artlessness" (素朴, soboku) have subtle interpretations that have been the subject of much commentary. These three terms are used to describe important qualities of native Japanese dog breeds, including the Shiba Inu.

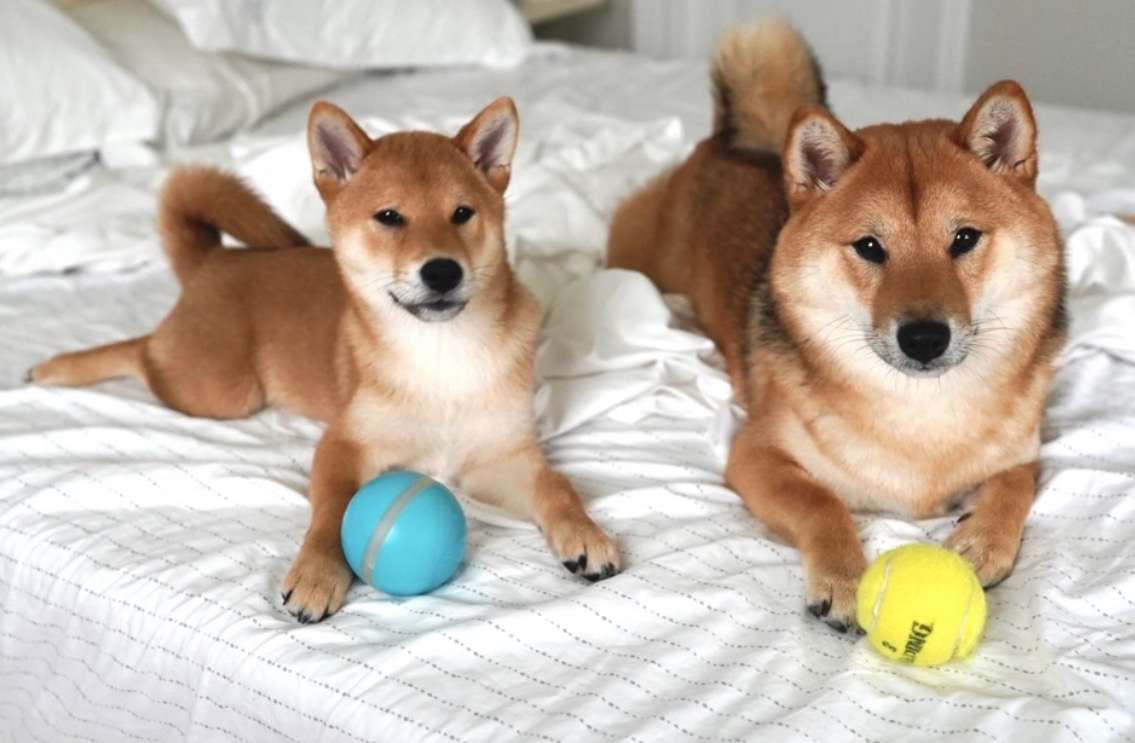
A Shiba Inu puppy and an adult

A survey of experts classified the Shiba Inu as having "high aggression, high reactivity and medium trainability". A possible explanation for this and other observed behaviour is that the Shiba Inu is more closely related to the wolf than domesticated dogs from other countries. Due to the high intelligence of the breed it requires a lot of exercise and stimulation. Insufficient exercise may lead to anxiety which leads to undesirable behaviours, notably the "shiba scream". The Shiba Inu has a reputation for being "aloof" and early socialization as a puppy is key for the dog to get along with other people and animals.

A survey in Japan found the Shiba Inu to be more likely to engage in destructive behaviour, refusal to walk whilst on a lead, engage in mounting behaviour, and tail chasing. The Shiba Inu was also found to be less likely to bark at noises whilst inside the house.

== History ==
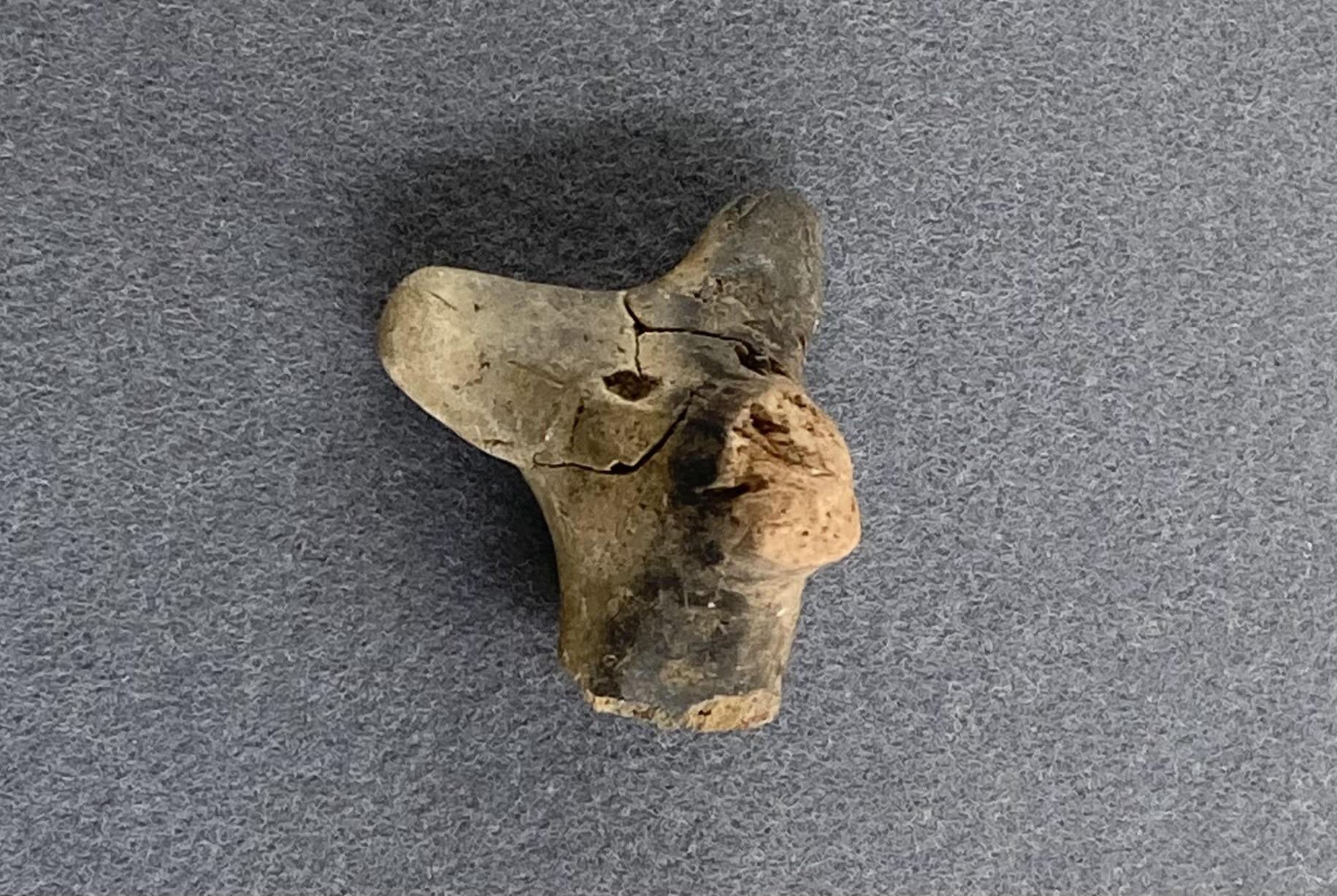
A fragment of a Jōmon period dogū with pointed ears, unearthed in Aomori Prefecture

The Shiba Inu has been identified as a basal breed that predates the emergence of the modern breeds in the 19th century. Dogs with a similar appearance to the Shiba Inu were represented in dogū made during the prehistoric Jōmon period of Japanese history.

The Shiba Inu was bred to hunt and flush small game, such as birds and rabbits. Shiba lived in the mountainous areas of the Chūbu region. During the Meiji Restoration, western dog breeds were imported and crosses between these and native Japanese breeds became popular. From 1912 to 1926, almost no pure Shiba remained. From around 1928, hunters and intellectuals began to show interest in the protection of the remaining pure Shiba.

Despite efforts to preserve the breed, the Shiba nearly became extinct during World War II due to wartime food shortage, as well as outbreaks of distemper in the 1950s and 60s and the Great Tottori Fire, which discouraged preservation efforts. All subsequent dogs were bred from the only three surviving bloodlines. These bloodlines were the Shinshu Shiba from Nagano Prefecture, the Mino Shiba from the former Mino Province in the south of present-day Gifu Prefecture, and the San'in Shiba from Tottori and Shimane Prefectures.

The Shinshu Shibas possessed a solid undercoat, with a dense layer of guard hairs, and were small and red in color. The Mino Shibas tended to have thick, prick ears, and possessed a sickle tail, rather than the common curled tail found on most modern Shibas. The San'in Shibas were larger than most modern Shibas, and tended to be black, without the common tan and white accents found on modern black-and-tan shibas. A 2025 study comparing the Mino Shiba, San'in Shiba, and common Shiba Inus found that the San'in Shiba was the most genetically distinct out of the three groups.

When the study of Japanese dogs was formalized in the early and mid-20th century, these three strains were combined into one overall breed, the Shiba Inu. The first Japanese breed standard for the Shiba, the Nippo Standard, was published in 1934. In December 1936, the Shiba Inu was recognized as a Natural Monument of Japan through the Cultural Properties Act, largely due to the efforts of Nippo (Nihon Ken Hozonkai), the Association for the Preservation of the Japanese Dog.

In 1954, a military family brought the first Shiba Inu to the United States. In 1979, the first recorded litter was born in the United States. The Shiba was recognized by the American Kennel Club in 1992 and added to the AKC Non-Sporting Group in 1993. It is now primarily kept as a pet in Japan and across the world. According to the American Kennel Club, the Shiba Inu is the number one companion dog in Japan. In the United States the breed ranked 42nd place in registrations for 2024 with the American Kennel Club.

== Health ==
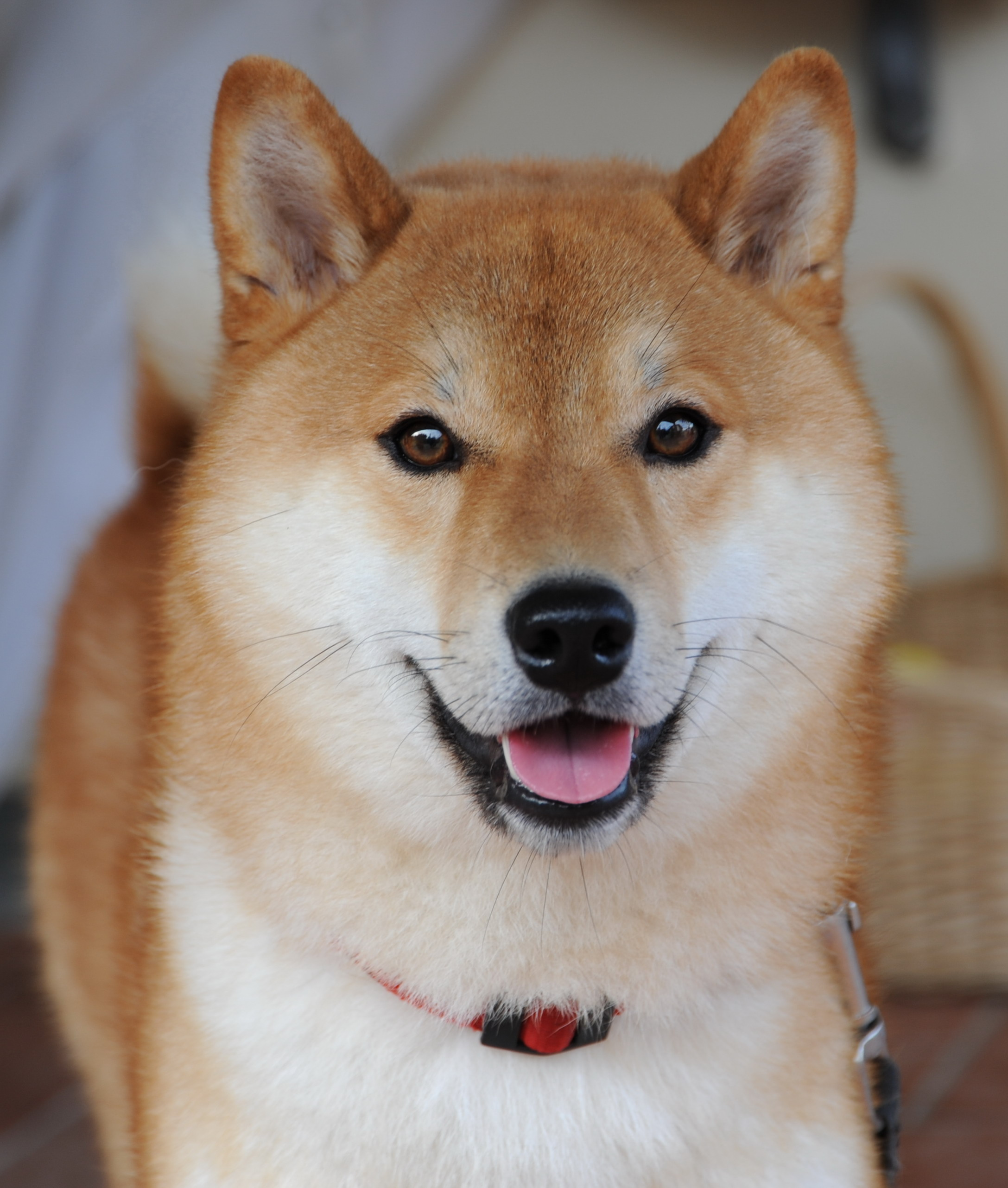
Closeup of a Shiba Inu

A study in Japan on patella luxation in small breeds found the Shiba Inu to have the second highest rate of the condition, with 35% of the Shiba Inus surveyed being affected. Three genes belonging to the breed were associated with glaucoma, as found in an analysis of DNA sequencing. Another study from Japan reviewing cases of dogs presented for ophthalmologic examination found the Shiba Inu to make up 33% of all glaucoma cases whilst only making up 2.7% of the total population used in the study. The Shiba Inu is predisposed to canine atopic dermatitis. An auto-immune disease common in Akitas Vogt-Koyanagi-Harada-like syndrome is known to occur in the Shiba Inu. A study in Japan screened 590 unaffected Shiba Inus for the genetic mutation associated with GM1 gangliosidosis. GM1 gangliosidosis is an inherited disease that affects the nervous system. Of the 590 dogs, six were identified as carriers of the genetic mutation.

=== Lifespan ===
A review of cemetery data in Japan found that the Shiba Inu had a life expectancy of 15.5 years, greater than any other breed. A 2024 UK study found a life expectancy of 14.6 years for the breed compared to an average of 12.7 for purebreeds and 12 for crossbreeds.

== San'in Shiba Inu ==
The San'in Shiba Inu is a variety of Shiba Inu. It comes from the Inaba Inu of Tottori Prefecture and the Sekishu Inu of Shimane Prefecture, and both are endangered due to the increase of western dogs. In the early Showa period, Masumi Ozaki, a former landowner in Tottori prefecture, started preservation breeding to prevent the loss of local breeds.

However, as World War II grew more intense, the breeding projects became difficult to maintain. Due to the use of dogs for fur by the military, the number of dogs decreased from 50 to 20. In 1947, the two breeds were bred together to create the foundation stock of the San'in Shiba Inu. The numbers were still low but the dogs were protected by the Ozaki family, who carried on the preservation activities.

Despite the end of the war, more threats to the breeds emerged in the 1950s and 60s, two outbreaks of distemper occurred in Tottori prefecture, killing many dogs. In addition, the Great Tottori Fire discouraged preservation efforts even more.

== In popular culture ==
Despite not being a popular dog breed outside of Japan, the Shiba Inu has become popular on the Internet. Doge is an Internet meme from 2013 characterized by Kabosu, a Shiba Inu, and broken English. A cryptocurrency, Dogecoin, is named after this meme, and its logo bears an image of Kabosu. Another cryptocurrency is also named Shiba Inu after the breed. Another Shiba Inu that went viral was a dog known as Cheems. He went viral during the COVID-19 pandemic and gained worldwide attention. Cheems died during cancer surgery on August 18, 2023 at the age of 12½ years. In December 2024, a man by the name of Kantaro Inagaki began to document his walks across Japan with a Shiba Inu named San-chan.

The breed is often referred to as Shibe in memes. According to Jamie Cohen, an assistant professor of media studies at Queens College of the City University of New York, the Shiba Inu breed has had a significant presence in online culture since at least 2010.

== See also ==
- List of dog breeds
- Cheems
- Shiba Inu Puppy Cam
- Kabosu
- Doge
