= Dog Barking at the Moon =

1926 painting by Joan Miró

- Artist: Joan Miró
- Year: 1926
- Medium: oil on canvas
- Dimensions: 73 cm × 92.1 cm (29 in × 36.3 in)
- Location: Philadelphia Museum of Art, Philadelphia

Dog Barking at the Moon (Catalan: Gos bordant a la lluna) is an oil painting by Spanish artist Joan Miró. It is held at the Philadelphia Museum of Art, in Philadelphia.

== Background ==
In 1926, Miró painted Dog Barking at the Moon in the town of Mont-roig del Camp, Catalonia. The painting is based on Miró's sketch of a Catalan folk tale which depicts a dog yelping "bow wow" at the moon while the moon looks down saying, "You know, I don't give a damn."

== Analysis ==
The painting presents a sparse, earthy brown landscape set against a black sky. However, Miró uses bright and playful colors to depict the distorted figure of a dog in the right foreground barking at the half moon and bird above it. In the left foreground, a ladder extends from the bottom of the painting before receding into the dark night sky. The vast, empty spaces in the painting create a sense of loneliness and isolation. Michael R. Taylor observes that Dog Barking at the Moon reflects Miró's memories of his native Catalan landscape and writes that the painting "exemplifies [Miró's] sophisticated blend of pictorial wit and abstraction".

== History ==
The painting was originally in the collection of Albert Eugene Gallatin before being bequeathed to the Philadelphia Museum of Art in 1952, where it remains. The painting is distinct from the similarly named Dog Barking at the Moon, a 1952 lithograph by the same artist in an edition of 80. A copy of the lithograph is in the Museum of Modern Art, New York.

In April 2021, Elon Musk shared an image of the painting on Twitter with the caption "Doge Barking at the Moon". The tweet triggered a more than 100% increase in the price of the cryptocurrency Dogecoin.
