= 2009 Webby Awards =

US internet awards ceremony

The 13th annual 2009 Webby Awards were held in New York City on June 8, 2009. They were hosted by SNL head writer Seth Meyers, and the lifetime achievement award was given to Jimmy Fallon. The awards were judged by the 650-person International Academy of Digital Arts and Sciences, and winners were selected from among nearly 10,000 entries from 60 countries and all 50 U.S. states. Voting by the public was available prior to April 30, and over 500,000 votes were cast. The awards ceremony was made available for viewers via the official Webby YouTube channel.

== Nominees and winners ==
(from http://www.webbyawards.com/winners/2009)

| Category | Webby Award winner | People's Voice winner | Other nominees |
|---|---|---|---|
| Games | Club Penguin (Archived 26 May 2009 via Wayback); Disney Interactive Media Group | Mafia Wars (Archived 3 July 2009 via Wayback); Zynga | Cartoon Network Universe: FusionFall (Archived 6 July 2009 via Wayback); Cartoon Network |
| Games | Club Penguin (Archived 26 May 2009 via Wayback); Disney Interactive Media Group | Mafia Wars (Archived 3 July 2009 via Wayback); Zynga | Kongregate (Archived 8 June 2009 via Wayback); Kongregate |
| Games | Club Penguin (Archived 26 May 2009 via Wayback); Disney Interactive Media Group | Mafia Wars (Archived 3 July 2009 via Wayback); Zynga | Rock Paper Scissors: Extreme Deathmatch (http://www.adultswim.com/games/game/index.html?game=rockpaperscissors); This is Pop |
| Games-Related | The Escapist (Archived 16 June 2009 via Wayback); Themis Group Inc. | GameSpot (Archived 8 June 2009 via Wayback); CBS Interactive | Destructoid, The Hardcore Gamer's Blog (Archived 7 June 2009 via Wayback); Destructoid LLC |
| Games-Related | The Escapist (Archived 16 June 2009 via Wayback); Themis Group Inc. | GameSpot (Archived 8 June 2009 via Wayback); CBS Interactive | Major League Gaming (Archived 9 June 2009 via Wayback); MLG |
| Games-Related | The Escapist (Archived 16 June 2009 via Wayback); Themis Group Inc. | GameSpot (Archived 8 June 2009 via Wayback); CBS Interactive | RockBand.com (Archived 17 June 2009 via Wayback); Harmonix Music Systems, Inc. |
| Mobile & Apps - Best Use of GPS | Adidas Marathon Run Tracker | Palringo Local | Sony Ericsson: Find It |
| Mobile & Apps - Best Use of GPS | Adidas Marathon Run Tracker | Palringo Local | Nokia Vine |
| Mobile & Apps - Best Use of GPS | Adidas Marathon Run Tracker | Palringo Local | Career Builder |
| Mobile & Apps - Best Use of Mobile Video | Skype Qik | Peyton's Priceless Pep Talks | mDialog |
| Mobile & Apps - Best Use of Mobile Video | Skype Qik | Peyton's Priceless Pep Talks | NBC.com |
| Mobile & Apps - Best Use of Mobile Video | Skype Qik | Peyton's Priceless Pep Talks | NBC Olympics |
| Mobile & Apps - Entertainment | Discovery Mobile | G4tv.com | E! Online |
| Mobile & Apps - Entertainment | Discovery Mobile | G4tv.com | NBC.com |
| Mobile & Apps - Entertainment | Discovery Mobile | G4tv.com | Please Fix The iPhone |
| Mobile & Apps - Gaming | Guitar Hero III: Backstage Pass (Archived 1 May 2009 via Wayback); Hands-On Mobile | Fanta Virtual Tennis (Archived 22 May 2009 via Wayback); The Hyperfactory | Cannon Challenge for iPhone (Archived 30 December 2008 via Wayback); Discovery Interactive |
| Mobile & Apps - Gaming | Guitar Hero III: Backstage Pass (Archived 1 May 2009 via Wayback); Hands-On Mobile | Fanta Virtual Tennis (Archived 22 May 2009 via Wayback); The Hyperfactory | Live Poker (Archived 20 February 2009 via Wayback); Zynga |
| Mobile & Apps - Gaming | Guitar Hero III: Backstage Pass (Archived 1 May 2009 via Wayback); Hands-On Mobile | Fanta Virtual Tennis (Archived 22 May 2009 via Wayback); The Hyperfactory | WPT Texas Hold 'Em 2 (Archived 19 April 2009 via Wayback); Hands-On Mobile |
| Interactive Advertising - Game or Application | Red Bull Flugtag Flight Lab (Archived 7 July 2009 via Wayback); Less Rain | Nike Football Head2Head (Archived 20 July 2009 via Wayback); R/GA | Orange 'Balloonacy' (Archived 12 May 2009 via Wayback); POKE |
| Interactive Advertising - Game or Application | Red Bull Flugtag Flight Lab (Archived 7 July 2009 via Wayback); Less Rain | Nike Football Head2Head (Archived 20 July 2009 via Wayback); R/GA | Rooftop Racer (Archived 7 February 2009 via Wayback); Crispin Porter + Bogusky |
| Interactive Advertising - Game or Application | Red Bull Flugtag Flight Lab (Archived 7 July 2009 via Wayback); Less Rain | Nike Football Head2Head (Archived 20 July 2009 via Wayback); R/GA | Spectra Visual Newsreader (Archived 31 May 2009 via Wayback); SS+K / Fluid |
| Online Film & Video - Viral | The Website is Down: Sales Guy vs. Web Dude | Shiba Inu Puppy Cam | Bill O'Reilly Flips Out - Dance Remix |
| Online Film & Video - Viral | The Website is Down: Sales Guy vs. Web Dude | Shiba Inu Puppy Cam | Wassup 2008 |
| Online Film & Video - Viral | The Website is Down: Sales Guy vs. Web Dude | Shiba Inu Puppy Cam | Where the Hell is Matt? |
This table is not complete; please help to complete it from material on this page.

== Notes ==
Winners and nominees are generally named according to the organization or website winning the award, although the recipient is, technically, the web design firm or internal department that created the winning site and in the case of corporate websites, the designer's client. Web links are provided for informational purposes, both in the most recently available archive.org version before the awards ceremony and, where available, the current website. Many older websites no longer exist, are redirected, or have been substantially redesigned.
