= Crasher Squirrel =

Internet meme

A golden-mantled ground squirrel stands in front of a camera while Melissa and Jackson Brandts are taking a photo of themselves at Banff National Park. The image has spread virally around the internet, making the Brandts, the squirrel, and Banff National Park momentarily famous.

Crasher Squirrel is the name given to a squirrel seen in a photograph originally intended to be a self-portrait of a Minnesota couple; it can also refer to the resulting internet meme.

== Photograph ==
The photograph was taken by Melissa Brandts and her husband Jackson while visiting Lake Minnewanka at Banff National Park in Alberta, Canada, in May 2009. While the couple was posing on boulders next to the lake, using a camera with a wireless remote shutter release to take photos of themselves, a golden-mantled ground squirrel began exploring the area. The squirrel stood up right in front of the lens, and the Brandts were able to capture the image of the squirrel, clearly in focus, in front of the camera.

== Popularity ==
In August 2009, the Brandts submitted the photo to the National Geographic weekly "Your Shot" contest in a bid to have the image included in an upcoming issue. Through this appearance, the photograph spread virally across worldwide newspapers and the Internet, popularized by sites such as Cute Overload.

The appeal of the picture is related to both the fact that the squirrel is perfectly in focus, and that its pose is reminiscent of the gopher from Caddyshack, with "paws held at chest level, eyes staring dead at the camera", according to Mike Celizic of The Today Show. While some questions of the photo's authenticity were raised by Matt Lauer, the Brandts were able to demonstrate that the single photo was legitimate and part of a whole set of photos that they had taken during that time period.

The photo of the squirrel has since been used by the Banff tourism board to attract visitors to the area. The Park saw a brief surge in visitors shortly following the viral spread of the image, and the board set up "Banff National Park Squirrel" Twitter and Facebook pages, using the Columbian ground squirrel as an "ambassador" to Banff. The tourism board also contacted independent developers that created social media applications around the squirrel photo to include web links back to their web site. These actions led to an estimated 82 million impressions through various forms of media within a few weeks, according to the board. The squirrel was made an honorary citizen of Banff in October 2009 by Banff Mayor John Stutz. Melissa Brandts has also set up her own Facebook page for the squirrel. In response to the popularity of the photo, National Geographic's November 2009 issue featured a "Your Shot" section devoted to readers' photos with animals, including the Brandts' photo.

The insertion of squirrel images in other photos has furthered the meme, and has been used for photographs of official diplomatic gatherings, family portraits, and famous works of art so that the squirrel appears to be crashing these gatherings. A website, "The Squirrelizer", was created by Graeme Hawker of Scotland to allow anyone to add the image of the squirrel to a photo; the site saw more than 130,000 hits within a week of its creation. The meme was considered one of the top memes in 2009 by MSNBC. The Squirrelizer, formerly hosted at lutralutra.co.uk, has been taken down as of 2010; there is, however, a Squirrelizer iPhone app.
