= Shiba Inu Puppy Cam =

Online viral video series website

The Shiba Inu Puppy Cam (also known as Puppy Cam or variations) is a website that featured a live-streamed webcam trained on the puppy-pen for six newborn Shiba Inu dogs born on October 7, 2008. It became an Internet phenomenon. There have been seven further litters.

== Origin ==
The live webcam was set up on Ustream in October 2008 by a San Francisco, California, couple to monitor their Shiba Inu puppies while they were at work. The live streaming website showed the puppies interacting with each other in a variety of ways: sleeping, playing with toys, tearing up wee pads, and snuggling with their mother, Kika. Links to the site spread virally. By October 13, 2008, three million viewers had spent 1.2 million hours watching the puppies via the Internet. As of July 2012 the Shiba Inu Puppy Cam streaming page on Ustream had received over 60 million views.

== Litters ==
A-Team

The six puppies (three females: Autumn, Ayumi, and Amaya and three males: Aki, Akoni, and Ando) were identified mainly by their different-colored collars. The collars associated with the pups of the A-Team are: Autumn (purple collar); Ayumi (yellow collar); Amaya (red collar); Aki (green collar); Akoni (black collar); and Ando (blue collar). This litter became known as "The Shiba Six" as well as "The A-Team", referring to the fact that they were Kika's first litter. The sire was a dog called Ch Jogoso's Notorious. The list of countries from which people watched the live webcast of the puppy cam from all around the globe grew to 74 countries in total with this first litter.

By December 7, 2008, Autumn, Akoni, and Ando had been adopted by new owners. Two other pups, Aki and Amaya, went to their new homes later that month around December. The couple kept one pup from this litter, Ayumi, and the camera continued functioning so that viewers were able to watch her interact with the other three adult Shibas in the house. The dogs' owners remain anonymous.

B-Team

Kika's second litter of puppies were born on January 16, 2010. They are referred to as the "B-team" of puppies to mark the 2nd litter. Their father was a red dog named GCH Morningstar's Dances With Wolves. There were a total of two female and three male Shibas. Two of the three males are cream-colored, the rest of the pups red. The puppies in birth order are the girls: Bella and Beni-Bara, and the boys: Bonsai, Bento (cream), and Byakko (cream).

By March 21, 2010, all five puppies of the second litter were adopted.

C-Team

On April 14, 2011, over fifteen hundred viewers tuned in to see Kika's third and final litter. As in the original litter there are six puppies, three of each sex. Unlike the previous two litters, the "C-Team" sire was a black-and-tan Shiba (a Japanese-born dog by the name of Kurosuzutama Go Aomori Sakaesou); however, despite the sire's color, all the puppies are red.

The C-Team puppies are, in order of birth: Chozen, a.k.a. "Zen" (boy); Chame (boy); Chisaki, fka "Saki" now known as Emi (girl); Charlotte (girl); Chiyoko, a.k.a. "Yo-Yo" (girl); and Chikara, a.k.a. "Taz" (boy). The last boy pup, Chikara, has the highest birth weight of any of the pups at 11 ounces.

D-Team

The fourth litter of puppies was born on May 21, 2012, to Ayumi (who was retained from the "A-Team" litter). They were sired by a red Shiba named GCH CH Kobushi Justa Draco Rosso AOM. They are referred to as the "D-team" of puppies to mark the 4th litter. There were a total of three female and two male Shiba puppies. One of the three females is cream-colored; the rest are red.

The names of the D-Team are as follows: Daiichi (boy, blue collar); Dango (boy, green collar); Dosha (girl, pink collar); Daisuki (girl, purple collar); and Dakota (girl, no collar, cream).

E-Team

The fifth litter of puppies was born on August 21, 2013, to parents Ayumi and sire Morningstar Dr McDreamy Chouseisou. This was the second and final litter born to Ayumi (who herself was from the "A-Team" litter). They are referred to as the "E-team" of puppies to mark the 5th litter. There were a total of three red female puppies (Eiko, pink collar; Eisha, purple collar; and Ember, red collar) and two cream-colored males (Enoki, green collar; and Edo, blue collar).

F-Team

The sixth litter of puppies was born on November 10, 2015, born to Chiyoko (a.k.a. Yo-Yo) from the "C-Team" litter, and Hiro, an AKC/UKC/NIPPO-USA Champion male Shiba imported by the family from Japan in 2013. This litter of pups are referred to as the "F-team" to mark the 6th litter that the couple have raised in their home. The litter had five pups in total; four female and one male. There were 3 red pups and 2 black and tan pups born.

The names of the F-Team, in order of birth, are as follows: Fuyuka (female, pink collar); Fumiyo (female, purple collar); Fate (female, red collar); Fuji (male, blue collar); and Fusami (female, green collar). Fate and Fuji are the black-and-tan colored pups from the litter. All the other puppies went to new homes as family pets in mid-late January 2016 with the exception of Fuji, the black-and-tan puppy.

Nori

A black-and-tan female pup was added to the household at the end of September 2016 and given the name of Minori with the call name of "Nori". It is believed that this female will enter the AKC dog show circuit and possibly be the couple's new foundation girl moving forward once all appropriate health tests have been verified. By August 2018 all required OFA health tests were performed and Nori was given an Excellent rating and a CHIC number. After Nori's third litter of pups (G, H, and I-Teams) she was spayed and now lives out her happy life with her new forever family.

G-Team

The seventh litter of puppies was born on December 13, 2018, to parents Nori and Hiro. This litter of pups are referred to as the "G-Team" to mark the 7th litter that the couple have raised, and the first in their new home. On another first, this is both Nori's first litter and will also mark a new lineage in the household as Nori is not related to Kika, the Shiba girl who is the mother of the first litter of Shiba Inu Puppy Cam pups. The "G-Team" consists of two pups, both girls with one being red colored, named Garnet, and the other being black-and-tan colored, named Genki. Both girls currently reside in the San Francisco Bay Area.

H-Team

The eighth litter of puppies was born on December 19, 2019, to parents Nori and GCH Jogoso's Forged In Fire (a.k.a. Max). Three puppies were born, each a different color; one red boy named Haiku (now named Toshi), one cream girl named Holly, and one black & tan girl named Hime (now named Hana). Two of the pups reside in California while the third pup lives in Canada. Hana has recently started showing in UKC and AKC conformation rings.

I-Team

The ninth litter of pups, Nori's third litter, were born on December 29, 2020, and was the first litter to include sesame pups. The father of the pups is a sweet sesame colored Shiba named Ushiro Kuro No Morningstar Go Ino Daikakusou (a.k.a. Kuro). Three puppies were born, one black & tan girl named Izumi (renamed to Miya), one red sesame girl named Imari (renamed to Ari), and one red sesame boy named Indy. At this time Indy has remained with the couple and who is currently shown in conformation.

== Fundraising efforts ==
The owners created a calendar in 2009 showing the various pups from the first litter on each month. Shortly afterward they created a mousepad and a number of greeting cards, which also featured images of the pups. Donations from the calendar are being sent to various Shiba Inu Rescue organizations around the United States, and that year the amount totaled over $6,000. In their 2010 calendar, the couple included their other Shibas, Yuuki (the eldest, a red female) and Haru (black and tan male) as well as pictures of the now adult Shiba Six, courtesy of their owners. As with the previous year's calendar, proceeds from the sale were donated to Shiba Inu rescue organizations around the US.

From April to November 2009, regular viewers of the Puppy Cam, who call themselves Shibaholics, collectively donated $11,172 to Shiba Inu Rescue Resources of America in honor of the SFShiba family.

The Summer 2009 issue of the Shiba E-News had an article on the Puppy Cam and the fundraising efforts of its followers on behalf of the Shiba rescue organizations supported by SIRRA. In November 2009, the American Kennel Club Gazette featured an article on the continued efforts of the puppy cam fans as significant contributors to SIRRA.

Shortly afterward, the Winter 2009 edition of Shiba World magazine featured an article on the Shibaholics, their donations to Shiba Rescue and their being ringside at the 2009 Nationals dog show in Clemmons, North Carolina.

As of 2013, an estimated total of almost $30,000 had been raised for Shiba rescue organizations in connection with the Shiba Inu Puppy Cam.

== Media attention ==
Less than two days after the pups were born, the first news articles about the "B" team started appearing. One of the first was on a Los Angeles NBC affiliate's website. Cute Overload, where many people first learned of the original pups in October 2008, again featured the pups on their website. The sites Gawker.com and Mashable.com also featured the pups. Before their one-week birthday, national attention to the puppies grew as they appeared on PeoplePets.com as well as the Bay Area Blog of The New York Times. A few days later the puppies were in the national spotlight again in the L.A. Unleashed section of the Los Angeles Times.

On November 14, 2008, NBC Nightly News broadcast a live feed of the camera to its national TV audience. On November 15, 2008, The Today Show interviewed the founders of Ustream about the puppies. On November 18, 2008, CNN coverage played several clips from the feed. Bill O'Reilly'sThe O'Reilly Factor show on Fox News used footage from the camera as representative of the overall trend of popular animal videos on the Internet. On December 11, 2008, Jeff Horwich of Minnesota Public Radio posted a song written about the puppy cam. Other major broadcast networks, including MSNBC and ABC, have also broadcast the feed. The puppies have been featured in magazines including Time, People, Entertainment Weekly, TV Guide, and online sites like boingboing, dlisted and Gawker.

In December 2010, Kika and her litter were featured on Animal Planet's Dogs 101 Shiba Inu segment, where the phenomenon of the puppy cam was noted.

In the animated cartoon The Mighty B! episode "Awww-esome!", the puppy cam's webcast was parodied as a "Puppy Net", and all the show's characters were hooked on watching it.

The Shiba Inu Puppy Cam was cited in the introduction of Cesar Millan's 2009 book, How to Raise the Perfect Dog: Through Puppyhood and Beyond, in which Cesar notes that he was "impressed".

== Honors and awards ==
In April 2009, the Shiba Inu Puppy Cam was nominated for a Webby Award in the Viral category, and it won the People's Voice Award. According to UStream, the Puppy Cam triumphed over nearly 10,000 entries from more than 60 countries.
