= Doge (meme) =

Internet meme

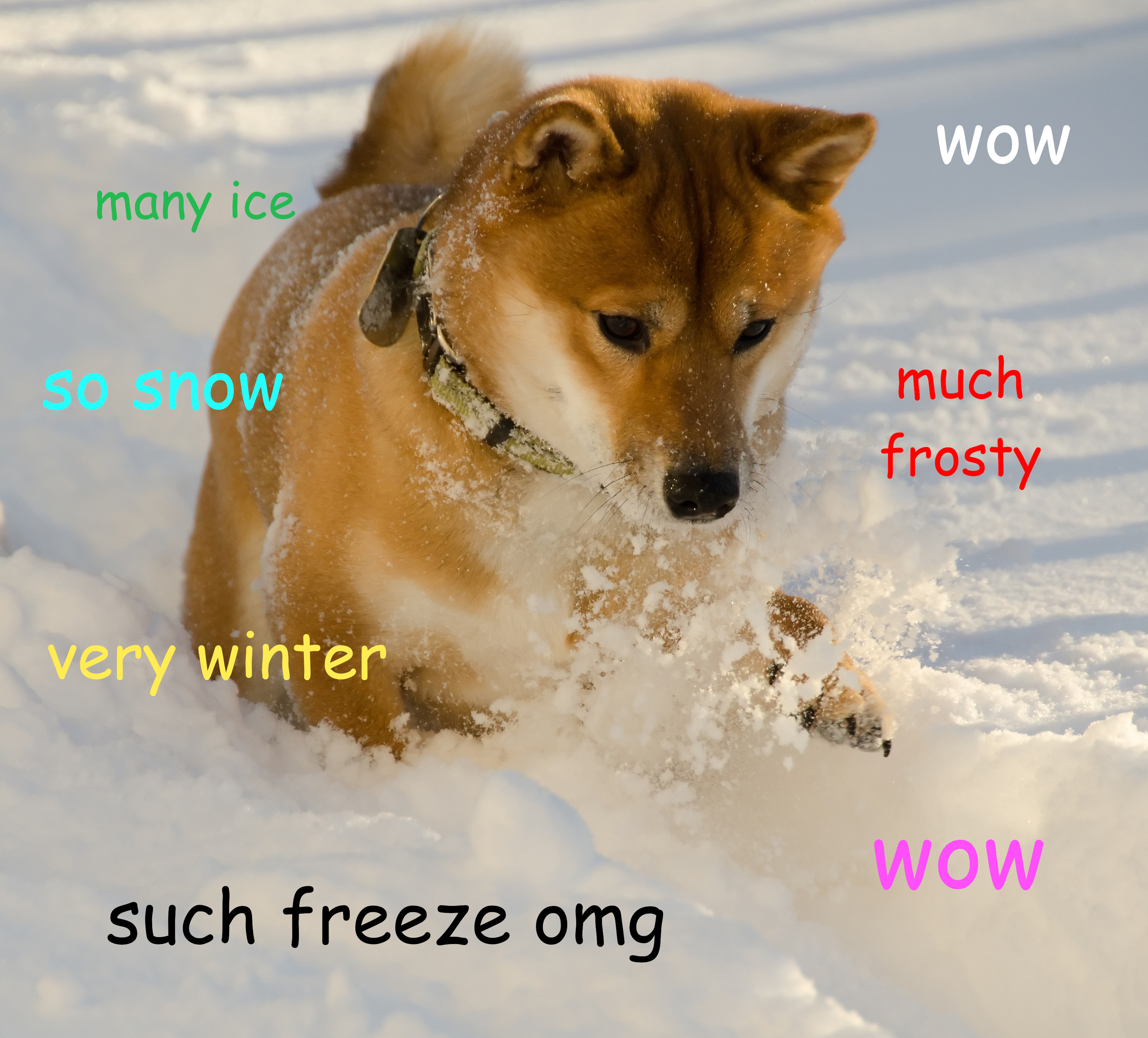
An example of a Doge meme

Doge (usually /doʊdʒ/ DOHJ, /doʊɡ/ DOHG or /doʊʒ/ DOHZH) is an Internet meme that became popular in 2013. It consists of a picture of a Shiba Inu dog that is accompanied in the foreground by multicolored text in the font Comic Sans. The text, representing a kind of internal monologue, is deliberately written in a form of broken English. The meme originally and most frequently uses an image of a Shiba Inu named Kabosu, though versions with other Shiba Inus are also popular.

The meme is based on a 2010 photograph of Kabosu that became popular in late 2013; Know Your Meme named it the "top meme" of that year. Additionally, in late 2013, the Shiba Inu had a notable presence in popular culture, including a cryptocurrency called Dogecoin that was launched in December of that year. Several online polls and media outlets recognized Doge as one of the best Internet memes of the 2010s.

== Structure ==
Doge uses two-word phrases. The first word is almost always one of five modifiers ("so", "such", "many", "much", and "very"), and the departure from correct English is the use of a modifier with a word it cannot properly modify. For example, "Much respect. So noble." uses the Doge modifiers but is not "proper" Doge because the modifiers are used in a formally correct fashion; the Doge version would be "Much noble, so respect." In addition to these phrases, a Doge utterance often ends with a single word, most often "wow", with "amaze" and "excite" also being used.

Since the meme's inception, several variations and spin-offs, including "liquefied Doge"—a variation in which the dog's shape is morphed into that of other animals, and "ironic Doge", a version in which the Doge character is put into ironic and uncharacteristic situations, and is depicted speaking coherent English phrases—have been created. The ironic Doge memes have spawned several other related characters, often also dogs, one of which is Cheems, another Shiba Inu who is typified by a speech impediment in which the letter "M" is used throughout its speech.

Walter, a Bull Terrier character who is typically portrayed as liking "moster trucks" [sic] and firetrucks, is another commonly recurring ironic Doge character. These memes are mostly present on subreddits like r/dogelore. In 2020, the meme "Swole Doge vs. Cheems", in which a muscular, anthropomorphic Doge and a baby Cheems are depicted as something that was considered better in the past and its modern version, respectively, became popular.

== Origin and pronunciation ==
The original photo of Kabosu, a Shiba Inu, that led to the meme

The original meme featured Kabosu, a Shiba Inu dog whose owner Atsuko Sato posted the famous picture of her in a 2010 blog post. Variations of the picture with overlaid text in the Comic Sans font were later posted on a Tumblr blog called Shiba Confessions. The meme also featured another Shiba Inu named Suki, who belonged to photographer Jonathan Fleming from San Francisco, California. Fleming's wife had accidentally washed a scarf, making it shrink; he photographed Suki wearing the scarf outside on a cold night in February 2010. The use of the intentionally misspelled word "Doge" dates back to June 2005, when it was mentioned in an episode of Homestar Runner's puppet series. The use of the misspelling began to grow in popularity after it was used in October 2010 on a Reddit post of a Welsh Corgi titled "LMBO LOOK @ THIS FUKKEN DOGE."

The most common pronunciations of "Doge" are /ˈdoʊdʒ/ DOHJ and /ˈdoʊɡ/ DOHG, though /ˈdɒɡi/ "doggy" is also used. In non-English-speaking countries, "Doge" is occasionally pronounced /ˈdɒdʒ/ "dodge". Those unfamiliar or unacquainted with the meme also use the pronunciations /ˈdɒɡeɪ/ DOG-ay, /ˈdoʊɡeɪ/ DOH-gay, or simply like the word "dog" /ˈdɒɡ/ DOG or /ˈdɔːɡ/ DAWG.

In Poland, the meme is known as "pieseł" ([piɛsɛw]), which is derived from the Polish word "pies", which means dog.

== History and spread ==
=== Initial 2013 spread ===
Online searches for the meme began to increase in July 2013. In August 2013, images of the meme were spammed on Reddit's subreddit r/MURICA by 4chan's random imageboard, /b/. In late December 2013, members of the U.S. Congress produced material in the meme's style; The Huffington Post commented Doge was "killed" because of the Congress members' use of the meme. In December 2013, a new cryptocurrency called Dogecoin was introduced, making it the first cryptocurrency to be based on an Internet meme; the viral phenomenon, along with use of the typeface Comic Sans MS, gave it "the Internet density of a large star" according to Medium writer Quinn Norton.

The Doge meme developed popularity on Chinese social media platforms beginning in 2013. In Sinophone online contexts, the dog's expression is often viewed as enigmatic. Weibo implemented the meme as an emoji, which further increased the meme's popularity, and which is often used to indicate whimsy or ambiguous sarcasm.

=== Continued popularity ===
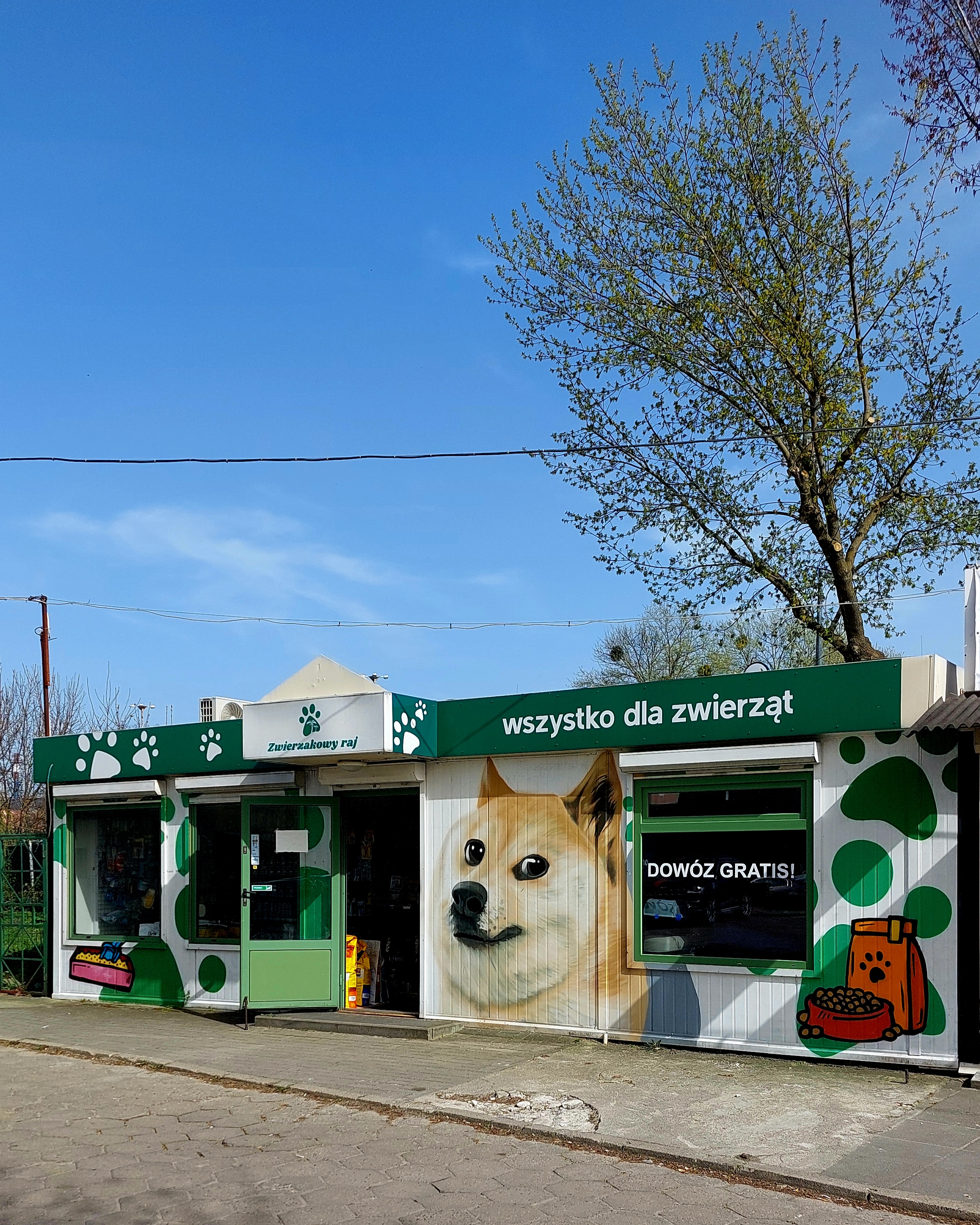
A painting of the Doge (Pieseł) on the wall of a pet shop in Łódź, Poland, in March 2024

By early 2014, Doge's popularity was sustained by Internet communities on social media, and was accompanied by the rapid growth and acceptance of Dogecoin. In April 2014, Doge experienced a second major media resurgence due to revelations of the Dogecoin community's intent to sponsor racing driver Josh Wise in NASCAR and place a picture of the Shiba Inu on his vehicle. The car appears in downloadable content (DLC) for the video game NASCAR '14. Media outlets embraced the meme while reporting on the cryptocurrency and the car, using titles that included phrases such as "so wow" and "very vroom".

In December 2016, a report on The Daily Dot found Doge's popularity peaked in 2014 and then fell due to "overexposure and co-option by advertisers and mainstream 'normies'", but remained stable since then and returned to Tumblr's top 10 shared memes of the year in 2016. For April Fools' Day in 2017, China Central Television published a hoax story of the death of Kabosu. In 2021, PleasrDAO acquired a non-fungible token (NFT) depicting the meme for US$4 million. In 2022, during the Russian invasion of Ukraine, an online phenomenon and group called North Atlantic Fella Organization (NAFO), where participants refer themselves as "Fellas", dedicated to countering Russian propaganda and Russian disinformation. The group posts pro-Ukraine memes, memes mocking Russian war effort and strategy, and "shitposting", and also raises funds for the Ukrainian military and other pro-Ukrainian causes.

Kabosu died of leukemia at the age of 18 on May 24, 2024. Her owner, Atsuko Sato, announced the news on her social media, stating Kabosu died peacefully while being caressed. Sato shared a heartfelt message, expressing her gratitude for the time she had with Kabosu and the joy she brought to people's lives through the "Doge" meme.

== Cultural depictions ==
=== In advertising ===
Convergence viewed the use of the image in advertising as a result of it being a widely recognized cultural icon. In mid-2014, the advertisement agency DDB Stockholm prominently featured Doge in an advertising campaign for the Stockholm, Sweden-based public transportation company Storstockholms Lokaltrafik. The advertisement promoted the company's special summer tickets, and featured Doge holding a public transportation ticket in his mouth, with phrases such as "many summer", "such cheap" and "very buy".

=== Online ===
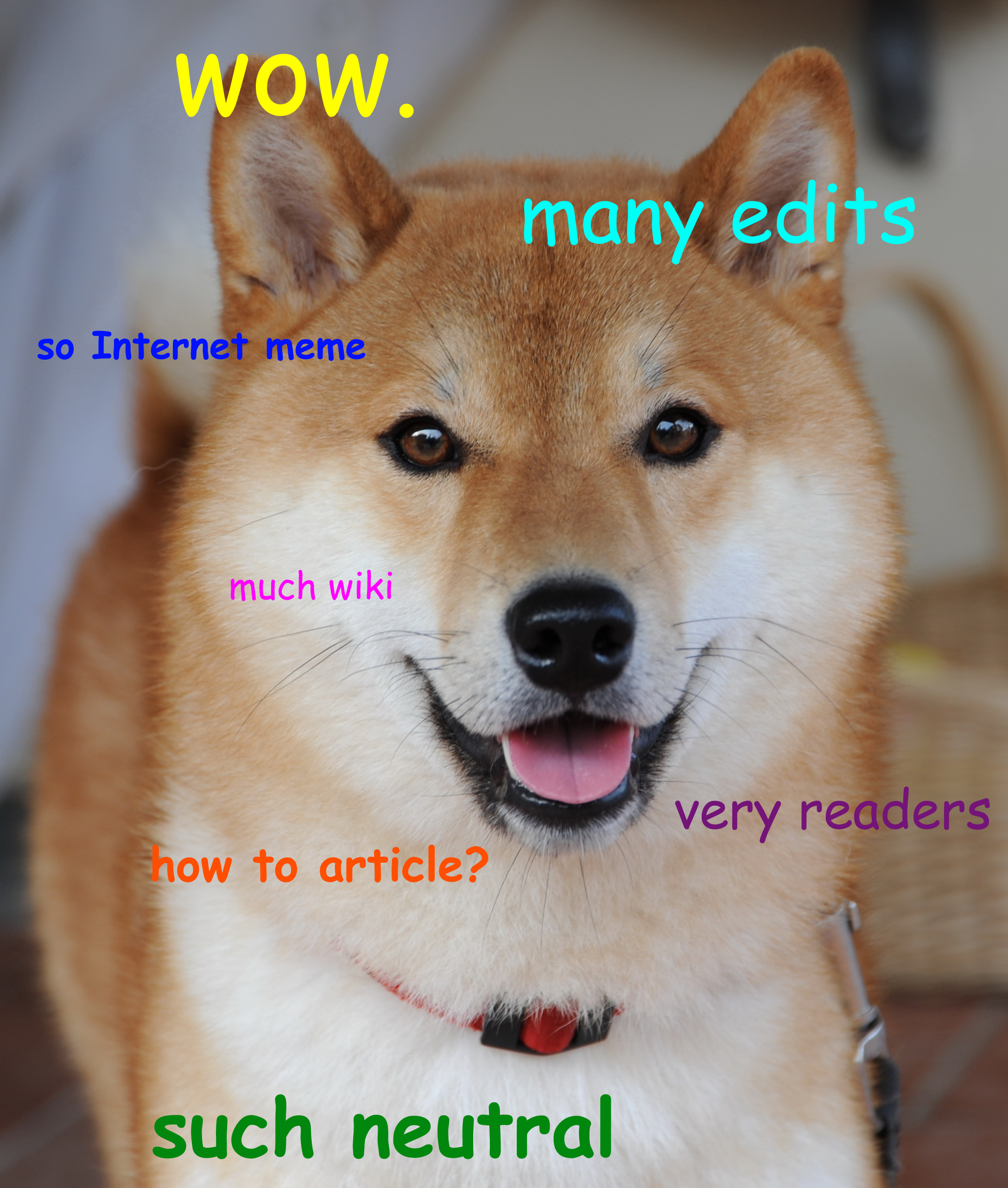
A Doge meme using terms related to Wikipedia

Google created a Doge Easter egg: when doge meme was entered into the YouTube search bar, the site's text would be rendered in colorful Comic Sans typeface, similar to the text used in the meme. In January 2014, Sydney-based web developers Katia Eirin and Bennett Wong created Doge Weather, a weather website and mobile app incorporating the meme. Doge Weather reports the temperature and weather conditions at the user's geographic location. In April 2014, Doge Weather became available as a mobile app for the iOS 7 operating system. Mozilla's Servo project incorporated the meme into the project's logo between May 2016 and February 2020.

Between April 3 and 7, 2023, Elon Musk replaced Twitter's bird logo with an image of Doge for website users. Some speculated it may have been a late-posted April Fools' Day joke; however, Thomas Barabbi of New York Post said the Dogecoin logo appeared days after Musk's lawyers asked a judge to dismiss a $258 billion racketeering lawsuit, accusing Musk of boosting the digital currency's value.

=== In entertainment ===
In the video for "Weird Al" Yankovic's 2014 song "Word Crimes", a song about bad grammar, a Doge tweet is used to illustrate the types of bad grammar referenced in that part of the song. A reference to the meme can be found in the North American version of the 2015 video game The Legend of Zelda: Tri Force Heroes. When examining an ancient bookshelf, the text reads: "Still, coming here has at least afforded me the rare chance to explore these ancient ruins. So ancient. Such ruin." The reference was met with mixed views from fans of the series. In the 2015 online game Agar.io, Doge appears as a playable skin that is accessed by typing the name "Doge". Just Cause 3 also included a special mode that popped up text in the style of the meme in response to certain player actions. In 2017, the video game Smite added a Doge skin for the goddess Skadi.

== Reception and legacy ==
"Doge" was one of several additions to Dictionary.com in November 2015. The website defines "Doge" as the image macro and its variants, and the form of "language" it uses. Several media publications included Doge on a list of memes that helped define Internet culture in the 2010s, and wrote on the meme's influence of further online developments, such as DoggoLingo and WeRateDogs. io9 compared the internal dialog of the Shiba Inu dogs to lolspeak. Evan McMurry of ABC News and Stacey Ritzen of The Daily Dot both ranked Doge as the number-one meme of the 2010s. In December 2019, Doge was voted as the best Internet meme of the 2010s on a poll held by The Tab, gaining 737 votes, 22 percent of total votes cast. Vox's Aja Romano included Doge on its list of 11 memes "that captured the decade", writing it took "cat memes to new, absurdist heights, an early hallmark of neo-Dadaist millennial humor." It was included on MTV's "50 Things Pop Culture Had Us Giving Thanks For" in 2013. Angela Watercutter of Wired described it as one of the best memes of 2013, and it was named the "top meme" of 2013 by Know Your Meme. In 2014, it became the first meme that was not a cat to win a Webby Awards for meme of the year. Mashable said Doge is one of the best "internet moments turning 10 in 2023".

In Japan, Kabosu and Sato are known as pet and owner rather than a meme; Sato's blog was the fourth-most-popular pet-related blog in the country as of December 2013. Reacting to the meme, Sato said: "To be honest, some pictures are strange for me, but it's still funny! I'm very impressed with their skills and taste. Around me, nobody knows about the Doge meme. Maybe I don't understand memes very well, because I'm living such an analog life." Sato has also expressed that she had learned that "the risk of the internet is that anyone in the world can see my life on my blog". Fleming stated in his experience, the Shiba Inu breed has become more recognized due to the meme.

In 2023, a monument to Kabosu was installed in Sakura, Chiba. A manhole cover with Kabosu's image was also installed in Sakura in 2024. On November 12, 2024, U.S. President-elect Donald Trump announced Elon Musk would lead the new administration's Department of Government Efficiency (DOGE), named in reference to the internet meme and its namesake cryptocurrency. According to communication scholars Ryan M. Milner, Doge is a meme that appeals to those within Internet culture but also uses elements that resonate with the general public, comparing it to Rickrolling, a meme involving a song.

== See also ==
- List of individual dogs
- List of Internet phenomena
