= Kabosu (dog) =

Memed Japanese pet dog (c. 2005 – 2024)

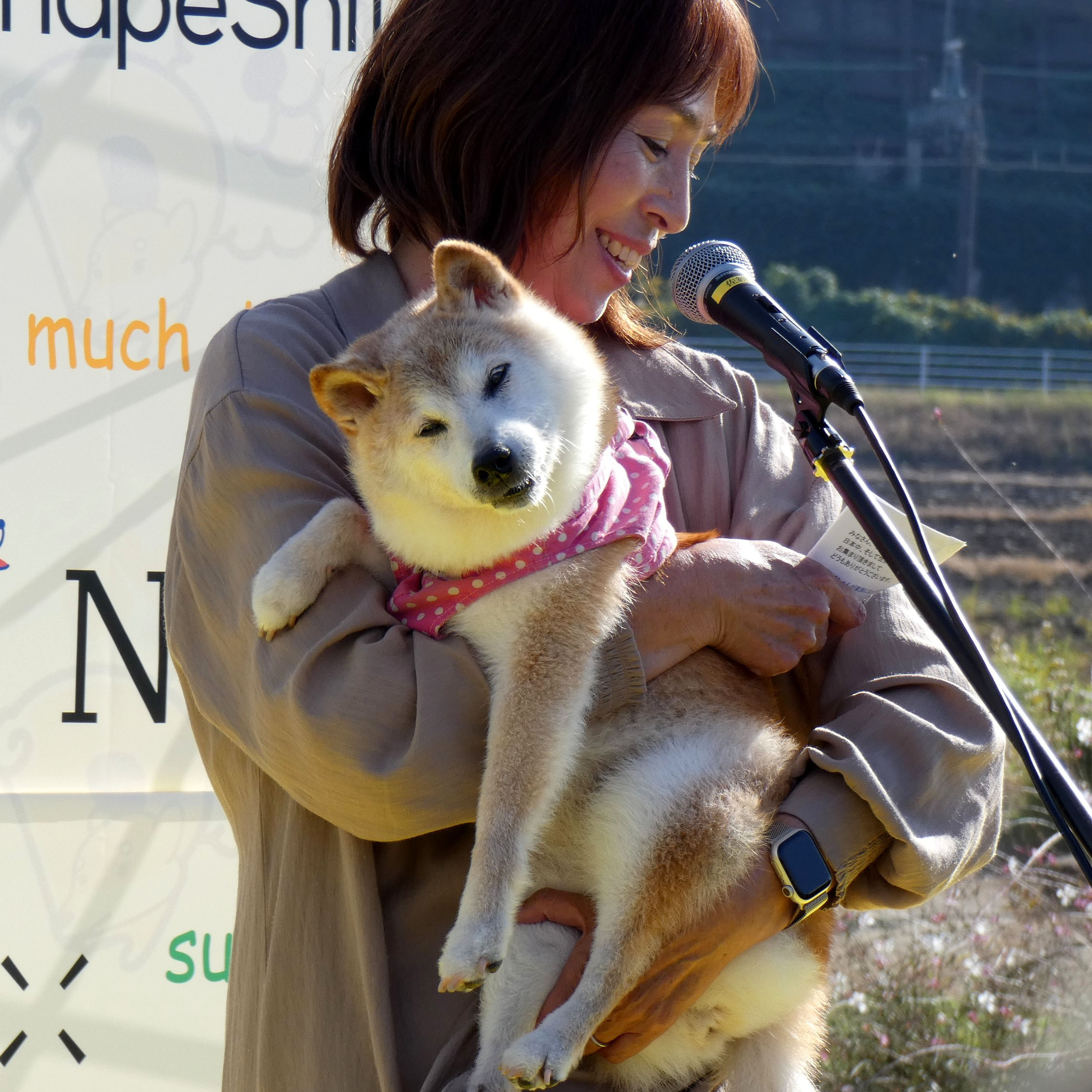
- Kabosu and Atsuko Sato in 2023
- Other name: Kabo-chan (かぼちゃん)
- Species: Dog (Canis familiaris)
- Breed: Shiba Inu
- Sex: Female
- Born: c. November 2, 2005
- Died: May 24, 2024 (aged 18); Sakura, Chiba, Japan
- Cause of death: Leukemia
- Nationality: Japan
- Notable role: Internet celebrity
- Years active: 2010–2024
- Known for: Doge meme
- Owner: Atsuko Sato
- Named after: Kabosu
- kabochan.blog.jp

Kabosu (Japanese: かぼす; pronounced [kabosɯ], c. November 2, 2005 – May 24, 2024) was a Shiba Inu from Japan. Adopted in 2008 by kindergarten teacher Atsuko Sato (佐藤 敦子, Satō Atsuko), she is prominently featured in the original Doge meme and the Dogecoin cryptocurrency.

== Life ==
Kabosu was a pedigree dog who was sent to an animal shelter when her puppy mill shut down. She was adopted in 2008 by Japanese kindergarten teacher Atsuko Sato, and named after the citrus fruit kabosu by a volunteer at the shelter. Sato kept the name, because she thought the dog had a round face like the fruit.

Kabosu was first pictured in a 2010 blog post by Sato; afterward, variations of the pictures using overlaid Comic Sans text were posted from a Tumblr blog, Shiba Confessions. The use of the intentionally misspelled "Doge" dates back to June 2005, when it was mentioned in an episode of Homestar Runner's puppet series. The meme she inspired achieved widespread internet popularity on Reddit, and 4chan, and inspired a popular meme coin known as Dogecoin.

On December 28, 2022, Sato announced that Kabosu was seriously ill with leukemia, but soon after that her health had improved. On May 24, 2024, it was announced on Sato's blog that she died at the age of 18, at 7:50 a.m. JST, in Sakura, Chiba. A memorial service dedicated to Kabosu drew more than 50 people, including some who were involved in the cryptocurrency industry.

== Reception and legacy ==
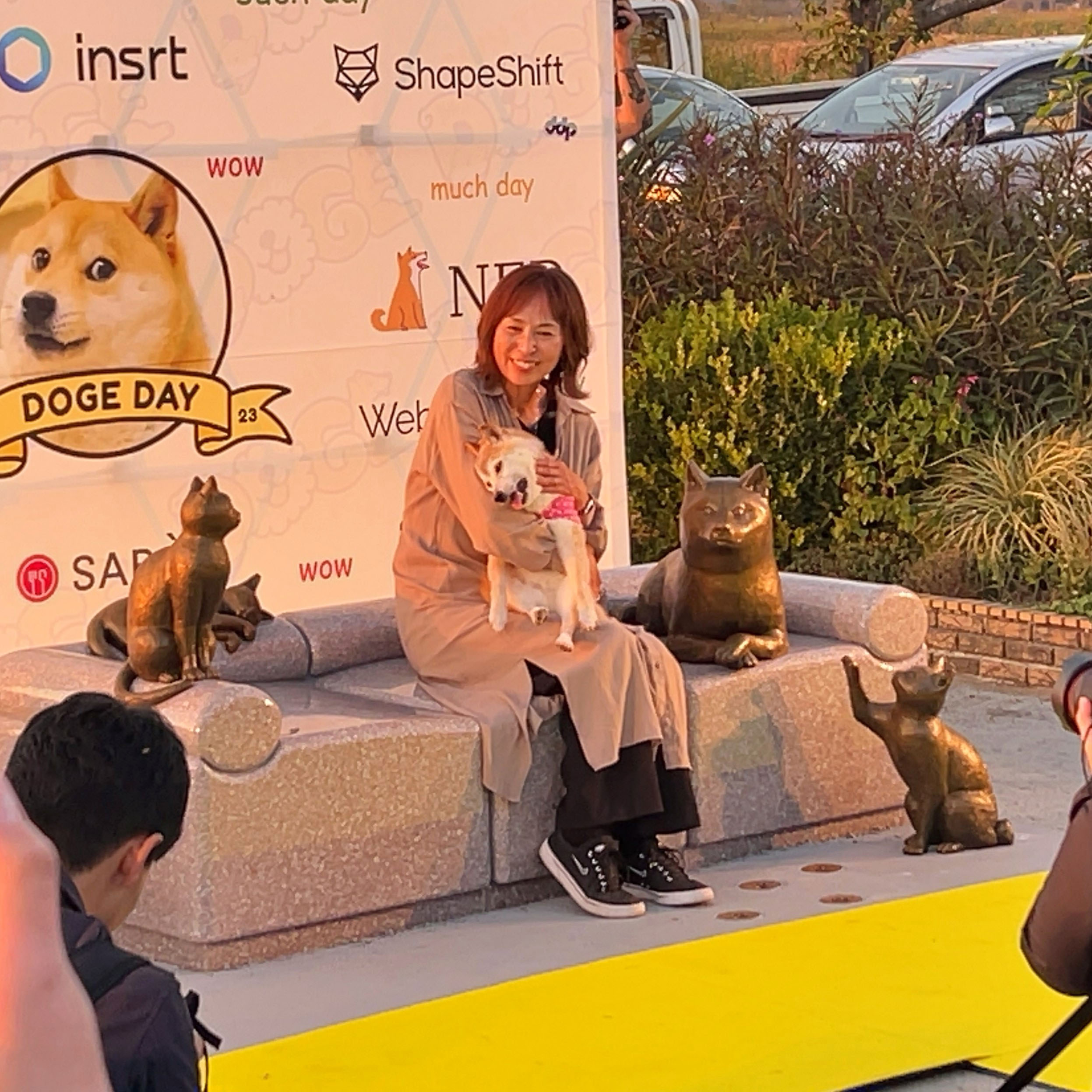
Kabosu and Atsuko Sato sitting on the monument to Kabosu in 2023

In Japan, Kabosu and Sato were known as pet and owner rather than a meme, and her blog Taking a walk with Kabosu-chan was the fourth-most popular pet-related blog in the country as of December 2013. Reacting to the meme, she explained, "[t]o be honest, some pictures are strange for me, but it's still funny! I'm very impressed with their skills and taste. Around me, nobody knows about the Doge meme. Maybe I don't understand memes very well, because I'm living such an analog life." Sato has also expressed that she had learned that "the risk of the internet is that anyone in the world can see my life on my blog".

Convergence regarded the image of Kabosu as, at one point, a central cultural icon, being used in commercial advertising because it was widely recognized. A non-fungible token of the meme sold for $4 million. In 2023, a park bench monument to Kabosu was installed in Sakura, Chiba. A manhole cover with her image was also installed in Sakura in 2024. A documentary film about Kabosu and her owner, titled underDOGE, is being developed by Scout Productions.

== See also ==
- List of individual dogs
