= DoggoLingo =

Internet "language" and slang

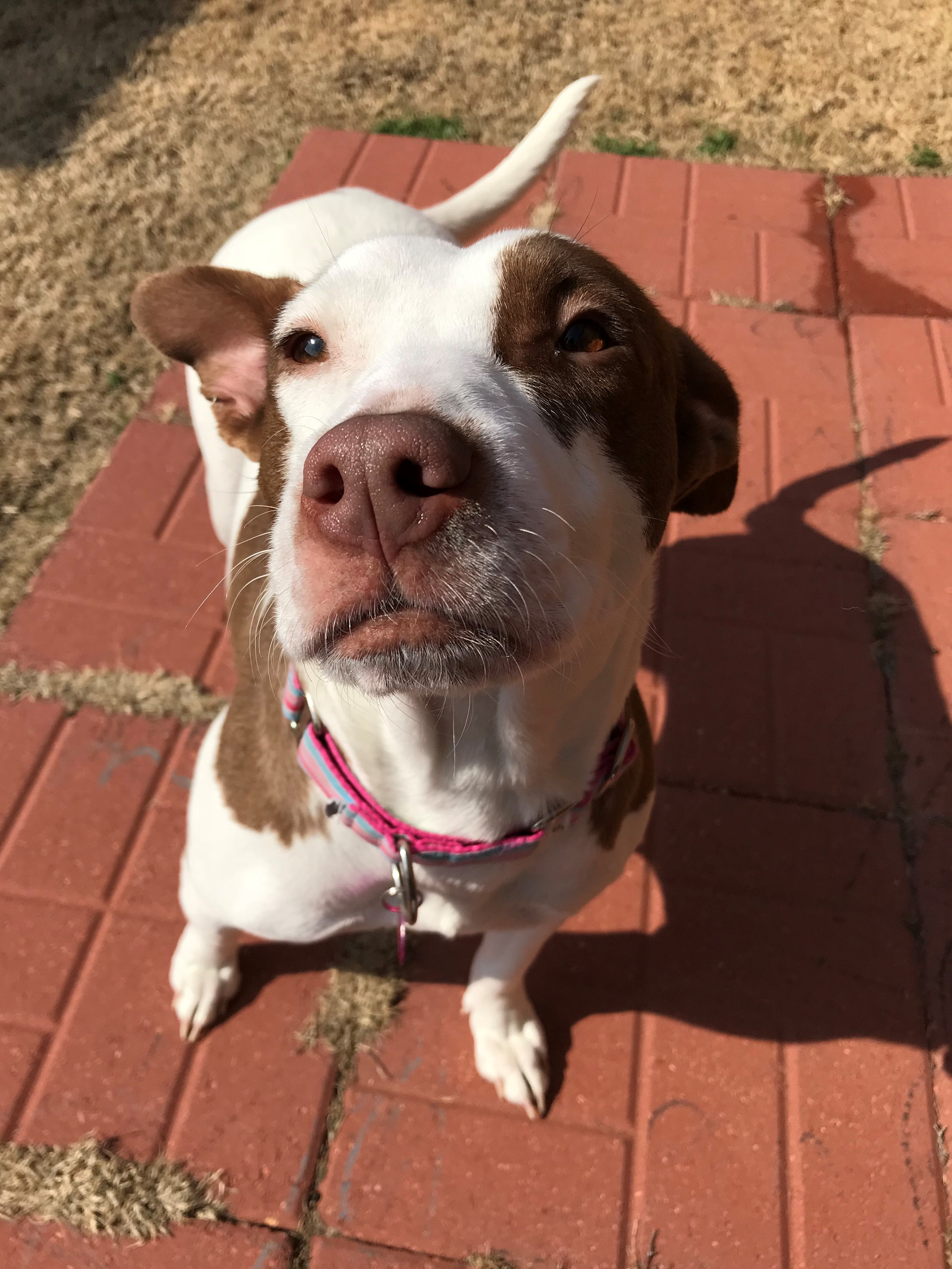
An example of a "Doggo" in DoggoLingo.

DoggoLingo is an Internet "language" that is created from word conversion, meme lexicon, and onomatopoeia. Emerging in the 2010s, DoggoLingo is implied to be a dog's own idiom, and is presented as a canine's thought process. Elyse Graham, assistant professor at Stony Brook University, describes DoggoLingo as "upbeat, joyful, and clueless in a relentlessly friendly way".

== Structure and usage ==
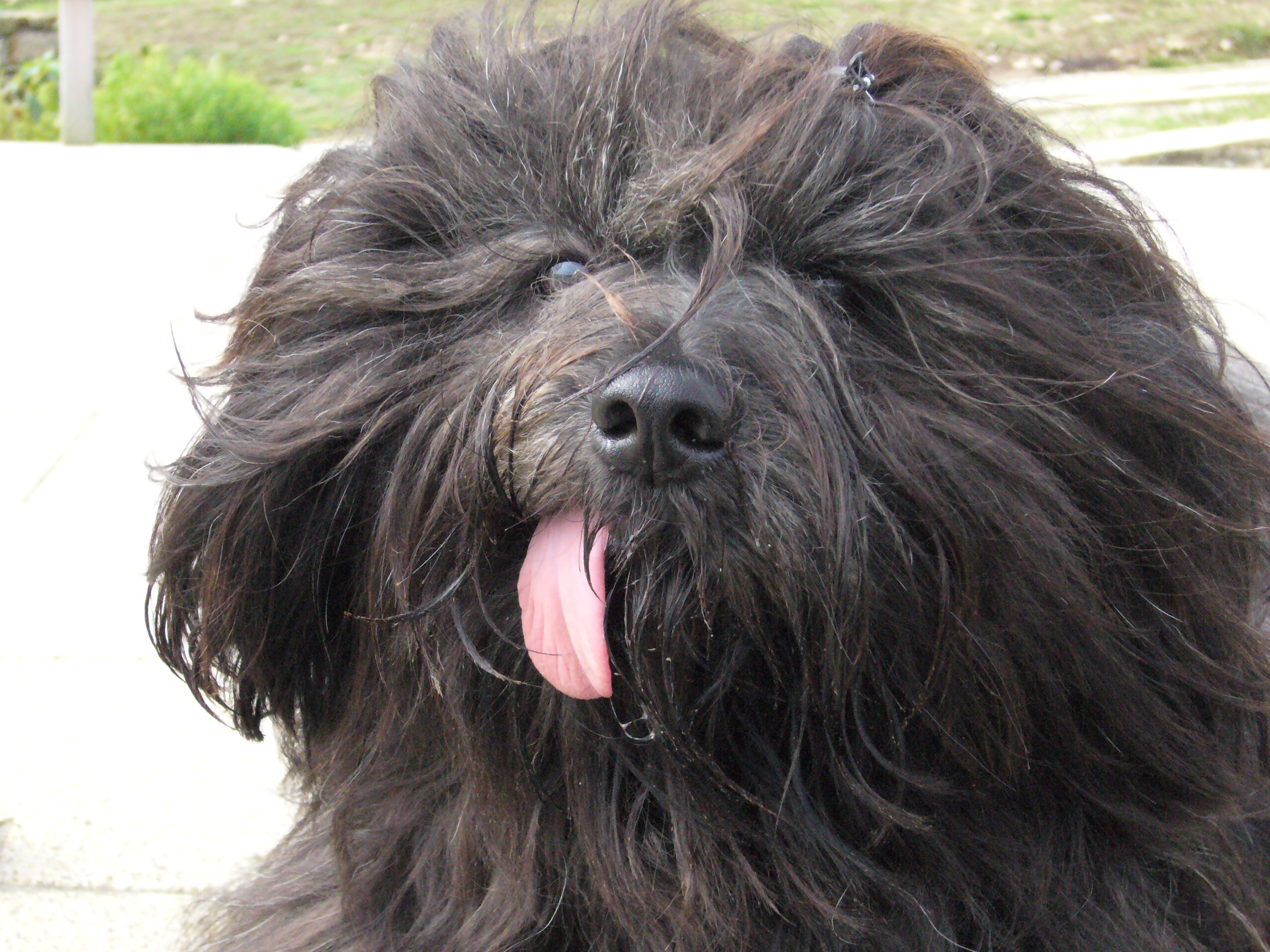
A dog sticking its tongue out is performing a blep

DoggoLingo appends various diminutive suffixes "-o", "-er", "-ino" to existing English words (e.g. dog turns into doggo, pup turns into pupper) as well as DoggoLingo words that have been created (e.g. pupper turns into pupperino). DoggoLingo relies heavily upon onomatopoeia: Words such as mlem or blep describe the action of a dog sticking out its tongue, or other forms of facial expression.

Much like a creole language, DoggoLingo follows a similar rudimentary style to create its verbs (e.g. doin me a in place of present participles with the speaker as object, such as doin me a scare "scaring me") and adjectives (e.g. heckin in place of degree modifiers such as extremely). Heck is frequently used in place of more conventional expletives.

Some words also come from eye dialect spellings of English words, such as fren, meaning "friend". In 2023, an analyst from the Southern Poverty Law Center said the term fren has been adopted as a deliberately "innocuous" and "baby talk" self-description by the far-right online, with the word being used as a backronym for "far-right ethnonationalist".

== Origin ==
DoggoLingo emerged in the 2010s. Various social media accounts such as WeRateDogs on Twitter and Dogspotting on Facebook, as well as social news aggregation and imageboard websites like 4chan, Reddit, or Tumblr have aided in popularizing the use of DoggoLingo by consistently using or hosting content that uses the lingo on their Internet pages. In 2014, the Dogspotting Facebook account gained popularity, especially in Australia where adding "-o" to the end of words is also a feature of Australian slang. Usage of DoggoLingo peaked around 2017.

Linguist Gretchen McCulloch characterized the language as "taking on characteristics of how people would address their animals in the first place", and noted that it was used by people talking as themselves online, in contrast to the mid-2000s lolcat trend where images of cats were captioned as if the cat were speaking.

== Other animals ==
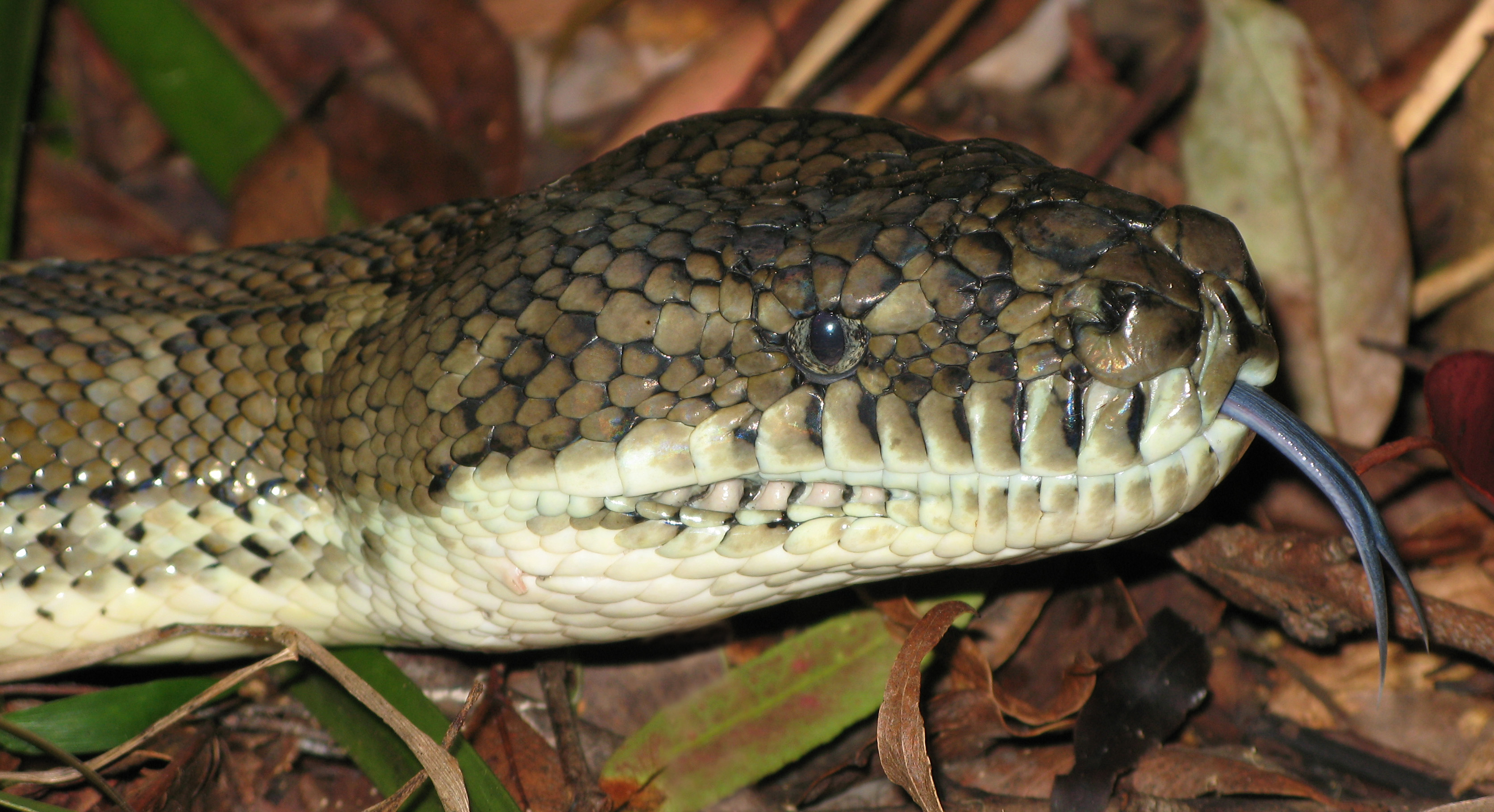
In DoggoLingo, a venomous snake or a constrictor like this carpet python may be known as a "danger noodle".

Many other animals are referred to differently in DoggoLingo: for example, one might refer to a snake as a snek, nope rope, or danger noodle, a human as a hooman and a bird as a birb. Fat or rotund birds may be called borbs by influence from orb, while birds with fluffy feathers are referred to as floofs.

== See also ==
- Cheems
- Doge (meme)
- Lolcat
- Pepe the Frog
