= WeRateDogs =

Dog-related social media account

WeRateDogs (@dog_rates)
- Website type: Social media account
- Available in: English
- Website: weratedogs.com
- Launched: November 15, 2015; 10 years ago
- Current status: Online

WeRateDogs is a social media account that rates people's dogs with a humorous comment about the dog. The account was started in 2015 on Twitter by college student Matt Nelson, and has received international media attention both for its popularity and for the attention drawn to social media copyright law when it was suspended by Twitter based on false Digital Millennium Copyright Act complaints.

== History ==
Nelson, a golf management major at Campbell University in Buies Creek, North Carolina, was inspired by Weird Twitter and had amassed a 10,000-person following on his personal Twitter account. In 2015, he and a friend were at an Applebee's, when he set up a Twitter poll from his personal account asking if he should create a dog rating account; the positive response led him to create the account, which combines cute animals with irreverent snark.

WeRateDogs asks people to send photos of their dogs, then posts selected photos on Twitter and BlueSky with a rating and humorous comment. Dogs are rated on a scale of one to ten, but are invariably given ratings in excess of the maximum, such as "13/10". Popular posts are re-posted on Instagram and Facebook. In 2017, Nelson started a spin-off Twitter account, Thoughts of Dog.

The account also has a branded game, an online store, and a book published in fall 2017. Nelson and his team of four receive 800 to 1,000 submissions daily and work to narrow them down to about one high-quality piece of dog content per day.

== Impact ==
As of December 2020, the Twitter account had nearly 9 million followers, and Nelson sees 30,000 likes on a post as being viral. His most popular post was of a dog marching in the 2017 Women's March, which was retweeted more than 50,000 times and favorited 134,000 times.

The account's language helped to popularise the "DoggoLingo" Internet language that refers to dogs as doggos and puppers. A 2016 interaction with Twitter user Brant Walker, when Nelson purposefully misspelled his name as "Brent", spawned the catchphrase "They're good dogs, Brent", which became one of the biggest memes of 2016.

WeRateDogs has successfully used the account to raise money for the American Society for the Prevention of Cruelty to Animals (ASPCA), as well as individual GoFundMe campaigns. In 2020, the account raised $1.3 million for more than 170 dogs.

In October 2017, Nelson released a book based on the Twitter account, #WeRateDogs: The Most Hilarious and Adorable Pups You’ve Ever Seen.

== Copyright issues ==
WeRateDogs brought media attention to copyright and suspension policies on Twitter when the popular account was closed twice because of spurious Digital Millennium Copyright Act complaints brought by competitors and unknown accounts. "For Nelson and many of his fans," wrote The Washington Post, "the whole ordeal has raised some serious questions about whether it’s simply too easy for pranksters to successfully remove content from the Internet by abusing the copyright claim process, particularly on Twitter."
