= Dogecoin =

Cryptocurrency

- Logo

Denominations
- Symbol: Ð
- Code: DOGE

Development
- Original author(s): Billy Markus, Jackson Palmer
- Initial release: December 6, 2013; 12 years ago
- Development status: Active
- Operating system: Microsoft Windows; Linux; iOS; Android
- Developer(s): Billy Markus ("Shibetoshi Nakamoto"), Michi Lumin, Ross Nicoll
- Source model: FOSS
- License: MIT License

Ledger
- Timestamping scheme: Proof-of-work
- Hash function: Scrypt-based
- Block reward: Ð10,000
- Block time: 1 minute
- Block explorer: https://dogechain.info/
- Supply limit: Unlimited (exactly Ð5 billion enter circulation each year)

Valuation
- Exchange rate: Floating (very volatile)

Website
- Website: dogecoin.com

Dogecoin (/ˈdoʊ(d)ʒkɔɪn/ DOHJ-koyn or DOHZH-koyn, Abbreviation: DOGE; sign: Ð) is a cryptocurrency created by software engineers Billy Markus and Jackson Palmer, who decided to create a payment system as a joke, making fun of the wild speculation in cryptocurrencies at the time. It is considered both the first "meme coin", and more specifically the first "dog coin". Despite its satirical nature, some consider it a legitimate investment prospect. Dogecoin features the face of Kabosu from the "doge" meme as its logo and namesake. It was introduced on December 6, 2013, and quickly developed its own online community, reaching a peak market capitalization of over US$85 billion (Note: US$85,314,347,523.) on May 5, 2021. As of 2021, it is the sleeve sponsor (Note: Sleeve only.) of Watford Football Club.

Dogecoin.com promotes the currency as the "fun and friendly Internet currency", referring to its origins as a "joke". Software engineers Markus and Palmer launched the satirical cryptocurrency as a way to make fun of Bitcoin and the many other cryptocurrencies boasting grand plans to take over the world. Dogecoin quickly gained traction, particularly on social platforms like Reddit. Within two weeks of launch, it had established a dedicated blog and forum and its market value reached $8 million, once jumping to become the seventh largest electronic currency in the world.

== History ==
Originally formed as a joke, Dogecoin was created by IBM software engineer Billy Markus and Adobe software engineer Jackson Palmer. They wanted to create a peer-to-peer digital currency that could reach a broader demographic than Bitcoin. In addition, they wanted to distance it from the controversial history of other coins. Dogecoin was officially launched on December 6, 2013, and within the first 30 days, there were over 1 million visitors to Dogecoin.com.

Palmer is credited with making the idea a reality. At the time, he was a member of the Adobe marketing department in Sydney, Australia, while Markus was a senior software engineer at IBM in Portland, Oregon. Palmer had purchased the domain Dogecoin.com and added a splash screen, which featured the coin's logo and scattered Comic Sans text. Markus reached out to Palmer after seeing the site, and started efforts to develop the currency. Markus designed Dogecoin's protocol based on existing cryptocurrencies Luckycoin and Litecoin, which use scrypt technology in their proof-of-work algorithm. The use of scrypt means that miners cannot use SHA-256 bitcoin mining equipment, and instead must use dedicated field-programmable gate array and application-specific integrated circuit devices for mining which are known to be more complex to produce.

On December 19, 2013, Dogecoin jumped nearly 300% in value in 72 hours, rising from $0.00026 to $0.00095, with a volume of billions of Dogecoins traded per day. This growth occurred during a time when Bitcoin and many other cryptocurrencies were reeling from China's decision to forbid Chinese banks from investing in the Bitcoin economy. Three days later, Dogecoin experienced its first major crash when its price dropped by 80% due to this event and to large mining pools exploiting the small amount of computing power required at the time to mine Dogecoin.

On December 25, 2013, the first major theft of Dogecoin occurred when millions of coins were stolen during a hack on the online cryptocurrency wallet platform Dogewallet. According to the platform's management, the hacker, having gained access to the platform, redirected all transactions to a single wallet address. This hacking incident spiked tweets about Dogecoin, making it the most mentioned altcoin on Twitter at the time, although it was in reference to a negative event. To help those who lost funds on Dogewallet after its breach, the Dogecoin community started an initiative named "SaveDogemas" to help donate coins to those who had them stolen. Approximately one month later, enough money was donated to cover all of the coins that were stolen.

In January 2014, the trading volume of Dogecoin briefly surpassed that of all other cryptocurrencies combined. However, its market capitalization remained substantially behind that of Bitcoin. Initially, Dogecoin featured a randomized reward that is received for each mining block. However, in March 2014, this behaviour was updated to a static block reward. Co-founder Jackson Palmer left the cryptocurrency community in 2015 and has no plans to return, having come to the belief that cryptocurrency, originally conceived as a libertarian alternative to money, is fundamentally exploitative and built to enrich its top proponents. His co-founder, Billy Markus, agreed that Palmer's position was generally valid.

During the 2017 to early 2018 cryptocurrency bubble, Dogecoin briefly reached a peak of $0.017 on January 7, 2018, putting its total market capitalization near $2 billion.

In July 2020, the price of Dogecoin spiked following a TikTok trend aimed at getting Dogecoin to $1.

On May 9, 2021, SpaceX announced a rideshare mission to the Moon completely funded by Dogecoin, thus becoming the first space mission funded by a cryptocurrency. Elon Musk confirmed this news via Twitter. DOGE-1, a CubeSat, was planned to be a minor 40 kg rideshare payload on Intuitive Machines' IM-1 mission in Q1 2022, but ultimately was delayed to a potential later mission.

On August 14, 2021, the Dogecoin Foundation announced the "re-establishment of the Dogecoin Foundation (est 2014), with a renewed focus on supporting the Dogecoin Ecosystem, Community and promoting the future of the Dogecoin Blockchain." The Foundation was reinvigorated by the addition to its Board of notable advisors such as Vitalik Buterin (Ethereum co-founder and inventor) and Jared Birchall (representing Elon Musk).

=== 2021 boom ===
In January 2021, Dogecoin went up over 800% in 24 hours, reaching $0.07, as a result of attention from Reddit users, partially encouraged by Elon Musk and the GameStop short squeeze. In February 2021, Dogecoin hit a new high price of $0.08 following Twitter encouragement from Musk, Snoop Dogg and Gene Simmons. In March 2021, Dallas Mavericks owner Mark Cuban announced his NBA team would allow purchasing tickets and products with Dogecoin; within two days, Cuban had declared his franchise had become the top Dogecoin merchant, having carried out 20,000 transactions.

In April 2021, Dogecoin and other cryptocurrencies surged, stimulated in part by the direct listing for cryptocurrency exchange Coinbase on April 14, although that platform did not provide trading of Dogecoin. Dogecoin first reached $0.10 on April 14, before hitting a new high of $0.45 on April 16 (up 400% that week), with a volume of nearly $70 billion traded in the preceding 24 hours. At the time, Dogecoin's market capitalization approached $50 billion, making it the fifth-highest-valued cryptocurrency; its value had increased more than 7,000% per year to-date. Interest in Dogecoin contributed to an outage in electronic trading platform Robinhood's cryptocurrency system on April 15, caused by "unprecedented demand", and prompted concerns from experts of a nearing speculative bubble in the cryptocurrency market.

On May 4, 2021, the value of Dogecoin first surpassed the symbolic hurdle of $0.50.

In April 2023, a Dogecoin increase was attributed to Elon Musk temporarily changing the logo on the Twitter app to a Doge logo. In June 2023, Musk was accused of insider trading by investors based on a series of stunts including the change of logo.

On August 29, 2024, Elon Musk and his electric vehicle company Tesla won the dismissal of a federal lawsuit accusing them of defrauding investors by hyping the cryptocurrency dogecoin and conducting insider trading, causing billions of dollars of losses.

== Use and exchanges ==
Dogecoin is an altcoin (Note: A slang term in the cryptocurrency and technology media and community for an alternate cryptocurrency, or, de facto, any cryptocurrency other than Bitcoin.) with a large userbase, and is traded against both fiat currencies and other cryptocurrencies on several reputable cryptocurrency exchanges and retail investment platforms.

Trading physical, tangible items in exchange for Dogecoin takes place on online communities such as Reddit and Twitter, where users in such circles frequently share cryptocurrency-related information.

Cases of people using their employers' or universities' computers to mine Dogecoin have been discovered including a Harvard community member and a student at London's Imperial College.

Dogecoin has been used in an attempted property sale, and it has been used in the pornography and gambling (Note: Primarily poker.) industries.

=== Online tipping ===
One major mainstream commercial application of the cryptocurrency has been Internet-based tipping systems, in which social media users tip other users for providing interesting or noteworthy content.

==== Dogetipbot ====
Dogetipbot was a cryptocurrency transaction service used on popular sites like Reddit and Twitch. It allowed users to send Dogecoins to other users through commands via Reddit comments. In May 2017, Dogetipbot was discontinued and taken offline after its creator declared bankruptcy; this left many Dogetipbot users losing their coins stored in the Dogetipbot system.

== Smart contracts ==
Dogecoin's blockchain cannot interact with smart contracts directly. Dogecoin can be tied to the Ethereum blockchain in order to access some decentralized finance (DeFi) instruments.

== Currency supply ==
Dogecoin started with an intended supply limit of Ð100 billion, which would have been far more coins than the top digital currencies were then allowing. By mid-2015, the 100 billionth Dogecoin had been mined, with an additional Ð5 billion put into circulation every year thereafter. In February 2014, Palmer announced that the limit would not be added in the codebase in an effort to create a consistent inflation rate over time.

== Mining parameters ==
Dogecoin's implementation differs from its predecessors: It was originally forked from Litecoin, then refactored to Bitcoin. Dogecoin's target block time is 1 minute, as opposed to Litecoin's 2.5 minutes and Bitcoin's 10 minutes.

== Fundraising ==
=== 2014 Winter Olympics ===
The Dogecoin community and foundation have encouraged fundraising for charities and other notable causes. On January 19, 2014, a fundraiser was established by the Dogecoin community to raise $50,000 for the Jamaican Bobsled Team, which had qualified for, but could not afford to go to, the Sochi Winter Olympics. By the second day, $36,000 worth of Dogecoin was donated and the Dogecoin to Bitcoin exchange rate rose by 50%. The Dogecoin community also raised funds for a second Sochi athlete, Shiva Keshavan.

=== Doge4Water ===
In 2014, The Dogecoin Foundation, led by Eric Nakagawa, began collecting donations to build a well in the Tana river basin in Kenya for World Water Day (March 22). The campaign, in cooperation with Charity: Water, collected donations from more than 4,000 donors, including one anonymous benefactor who donated 14,000,000 dogecoin (worth approximately $11,000 at the time), raising over US$30,000.

=== NASCAR ===
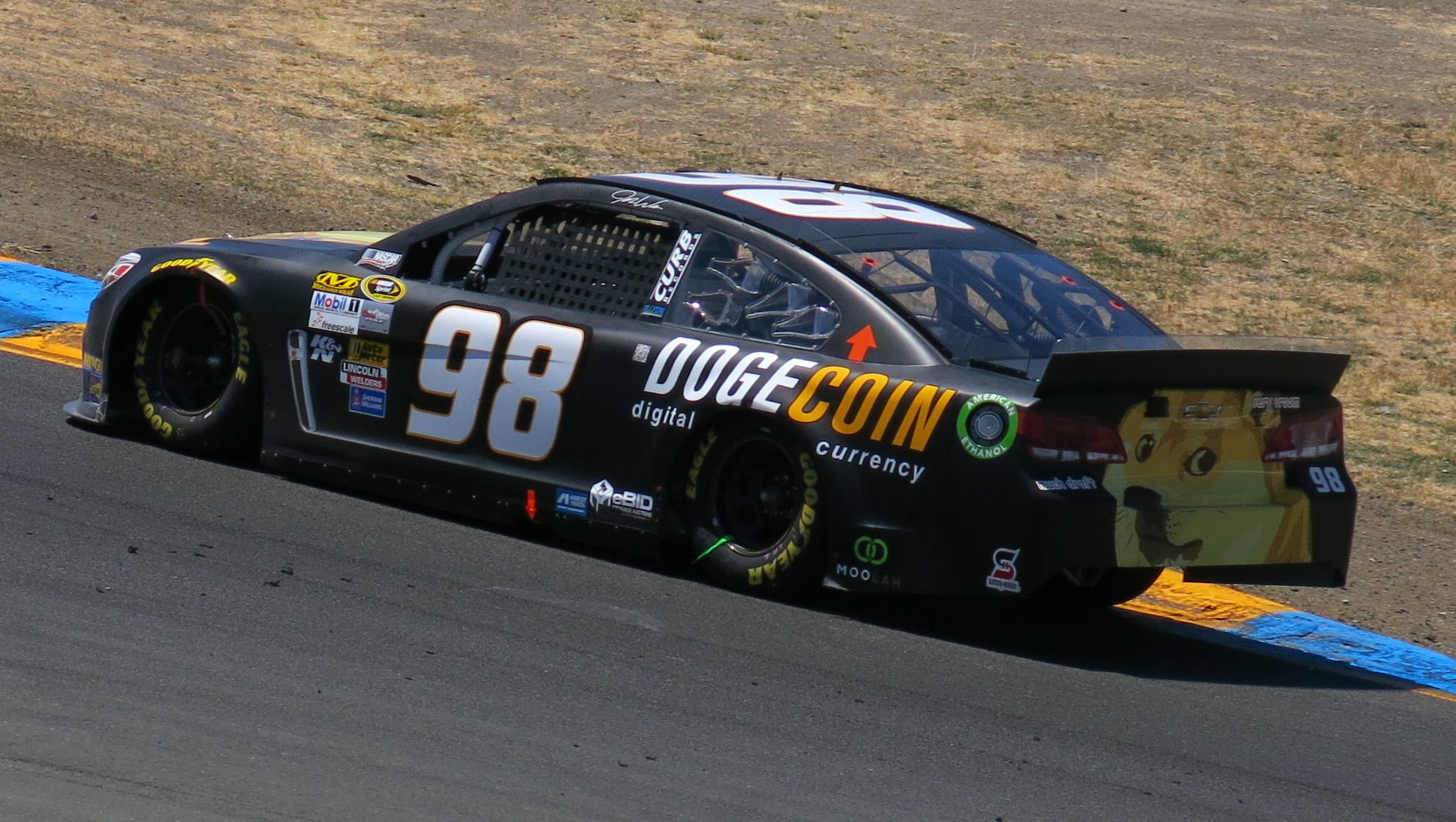
Josh Wise's Dogecoin-sponsored Chevrolet in 2014

On March 25, 2014, the Dogecoin community successfully raised Ð67.8 million (around US$55,000 at the time) in an effort to sponsor NASCAR Sprint Cup Series driver Josh Wise. Nicknamed the "Moonrocket", the No. 98 car featured a Dogecoin/Reddit-sponsored paint scheme and was driven by Wise at the Aaron's 499 at Talladega Superspeedway. Wise and the car were featured for nearly a minute, during which the race commentators discussed Dogecoin and the crowdfunding effort, while finishing twentieth and narrowly avoiding multiple wrecks.

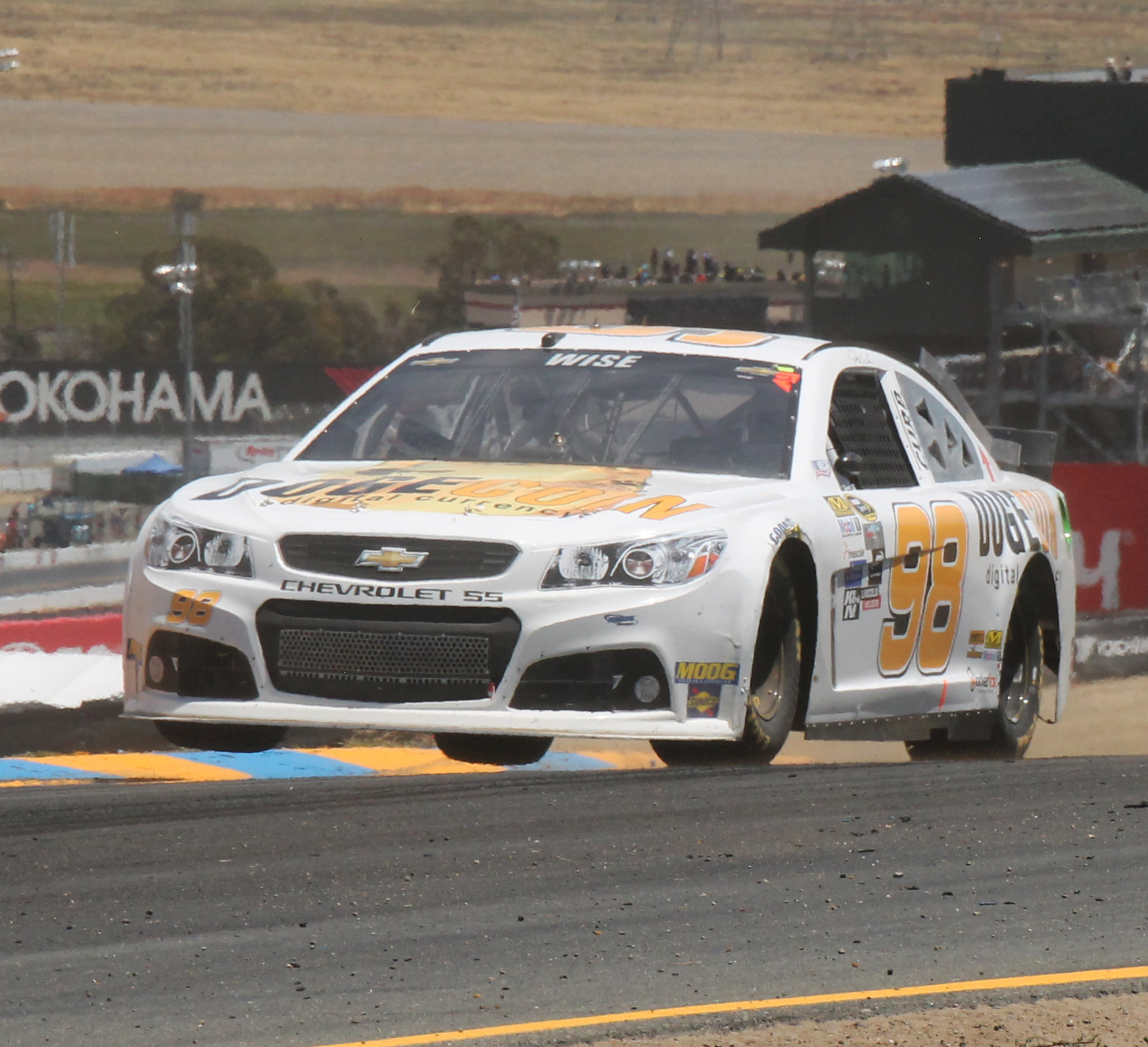
Josh Wise 2015 Chevrolet DogeCoin racecar

On May 16, 2014, Wise won a spot at the Sprint All-Star Race through an online fan vote beating Danica Patrick, largely due to the efforts of the Dogecoin Reddit community. He finished the race in fifteenth, the last car running. Eutechnyx, the developer of the NASCAR '14 video game, added the Dogecoin car as a drivable car in a DLC pack.

In 2021, Dogecoin co-sponsored the No. 99 NASCAR Xfinity Series car of B. J. McLeod Motorsports in the Alsco Uniforms 300 at Las Vegas. The car was driven by Stefan Parsons, whose father Phil Parsons ran Phil Parsons Racing that fielded Wise's No. 98, with additional backing from Springrates.

== Sports ownership ==
In Summer 2025, it was announced that House of Doge, an investment arm of Dogecoin, had become the largest equity holder in Italian soccer team US Triestina Calcio 1918. Shortly after, it became the second largest investor in Swiss ice hockey team HC Sierre.

In Spring 2026, House of Doge became the main investor in Milano Hockey Club, an expansion ICE Hockey League team with plans to begin operations in the 2026–27 season.

== Criticism ==
Dogecoin's origin as a "joke", which makes it the first meme coin, has made it difficult to be taken seriously by mainstream media and financial experts. The cryptocurrency has had a long and problematic history of scams. Similar to many other cryptocurrencies, Dogecoin has been described by some commentators as a form of Ponzi scheme. Critics allege that Dogecoin investors who purchased Dogecoins early on, have a large financial incentive to draw others into purchasing more Dogecoins in order to drive the price up, therefore benefitting the early investors financially at the direct expense of later purchasers. This is primarily because Dogecoin does not have a supply cap like other cryptocurrencies such as Bitcoin, which has a capped supply of 21 million coins.

== Elon Musk and Dogecoin ==
Elon Musk frequently uses his X platform to express his views on Dogecoin, which has led some to claim that his actions amount to market manipulation because the price of Dogecoin frequently experiences price movements shortly after his tweets. Nevertheless, because cryptocurrencies are not regulated like stocks, these actions are not illegal. Musk and his promotion of Dogecoin have been criticized by Dogecoin co-founder Jackson Palmer, who called Musk a "self-absorbed grifter".

Musk's first Dogecoin-related tweet occurred on December 20, 2020. Musk tweeted "One Word: Doge". Shortly after, the value of Dogecoin rose by 20%. This was followed by a series of Dogecoin-related tweets by Musk in early February 2021 captioned "Dogecoin is the people's crypto" and "no highs, no lows, only Doge". Following these tweets, the value of Dogecoin rose by roughly 40%.

On April 15, 2021, the price of Dogecoin rose by more than 100% after Musk tweeted an image of Joan Miró's Dog Barking at the Moon painting captioned "Doge Barking at the Moon", a message which was taken by some as a reference to the industry slang term "to the moon", meaning a hoped-for increase in a cryptocurrency's value.

On May 8, 2021, Dogecoin fell as much as 29.5%, dropping to US$0.49 during Musk's Saturday Night Live appearance. It then rose by 11% on May 20, 2021, shortly after Musk tweeted a Doge-related meme. In the same month, the price of Dogecoin was up 10% in the hours after Musk tweeted a Reddit link for users to submit proposals to improve the cryptocurrency.

On December 14, 2021, Dogecoin spiked more than 20% after Musk said that Tesla will accept the currency as a means of payment for Tesla merchandise.

On June 16, 2022, Elon Musk was named in a complaint seeking damages of $258 billion. The complaint was filed in federal court in Manhattan by plaintiff Keith Johnson. Johnson cited Musk's repeated use of his massive social influence to promote the altcoin, which he claims artificially inflated the price.

Prior to Musk's acquisition of Twitter, he had suggested that Dogecoin could be used for Twitter transactions, such as the purchase of Twitter Blue accounts. On October 27, 2022, Elon Musk completed a deal to take Twitter private. This led to a sustained rise in the price of Dogecoin from October 25 to October 29, with Dogecoin increasing as much as 46%. When X announced the launch of its X Money Account digital wallet product in February 2025, cryptocurrencies were not supported.

Between April 3 and April 7, 2023, Twitter's bird logo was replaced with an image of the Doge meme for desktop users, leading to a rise in Dogecoin prices. No reason was given for the icon change, with some speculating that it was a late April Fool's joke, or an attempt to troll investors over the Dogecoin lawsuit that Musk was seeking to end that week.

On November 14, 2024, president-elect Donald Trump announced that Elon Musk and Vivek Ramaswamy would lead a new Department of Government Efficiency or DOGE for short, an acronym that shares the name of Dogecoin. The price of Dogecoin spiked soon after.

== See also ==
- Shiba Inu (cryptocurrency)
