= Cute Overload =

Cute Overload logo

Cute Overload was a blog featuring commentary, photos and videos related to various aspects of cuteness in animals. The site was created by Megan Frost. It ranked #803 in the most influential English blog list compiled by Technorati, #16,387 in Alexa's "World Traffic Ranking" and, according to Quantcast, it received an average of 33,700 visits per day in 2011. On January 18, 2016, the site announced it was closing down.

== Awards ==
Cute Overload won the 2006 Webby Awards "People's Voice" honors in the blog category, the 2007 Bloggies for Best American Weblog, and the 2009 "Weblog Awards" winner as "Best Topical Weblog".

== "Rules of Cuteness" ==
The website featured "Rules of Cuteness", an evolving list of characteristics of cuteness:

- Rule #1: Paw up in the air
- Rule #2: Look helpless.
- Rule #3: An inquisitive look.
- Rule #4: More than one species of baby flopping around is cute.
- Rule #5: Fisheye lens + baby animal is always cute.
- Rule #6: Mimicking humans is cute.
- Rule #7: A thing, accompanied by a smaller version of that thing, is always cute.
