= Convergence (journal) =

- Discipline: Media studies
- Language: English
- Edited by: Sarah Atkinson and Helen Kennedy

Publication details
- History: 1995-present
- Publisher: SAGE Publications
- Frequency: Quarterly

Standard abbreviations
- ISO 4: Convergence

Indexing
- ISSN: 1354-8565 (print); 1748-7382 (web)
- LCCN: 97034285
- OCLC no.: 60629730

Links
- Journal homepage; Online access; Online archive

Convergence: The International Journal of Research into New Media Technologies is a Q1-ranked (ranking by Scimago) quarterly peer-reviewed academic journal that covers the fields of communications and media. The current editors are Sarah Aitkinson (King's College London) and Helen Kennedy (University of Nottingham). It was founded in 1995 by Julia Knight and Alexis Weedon (University of Bedfordshire) who edited volumes 1-23. The journal set the agenda for research the social and cultural implications of the new media technologies. First published by John Libbey Media, and then The University of Luton Press, it is now published by SAGE Publications.

It has published research by Amy Bruckman, danah boyd, Larissa Hjorth, Stine Lomborg, Mette Mortensen, Simone Murray, Kate Pullinger, T.L. Taylor, M Whiteman, Andre Caron, Jay Bolter, Henry Jenkins, Annette Markham, Mark Deuze, amongst others.

== Abstracting and indexing ==
The journal is abstracted and indexed in:

- British Education Index
- Compendex
- Film and Television Literature Index
- Scopus
- Zetoc
- Scopus
- Social Sciences Citation Index
