= Poodle =

Dog breed

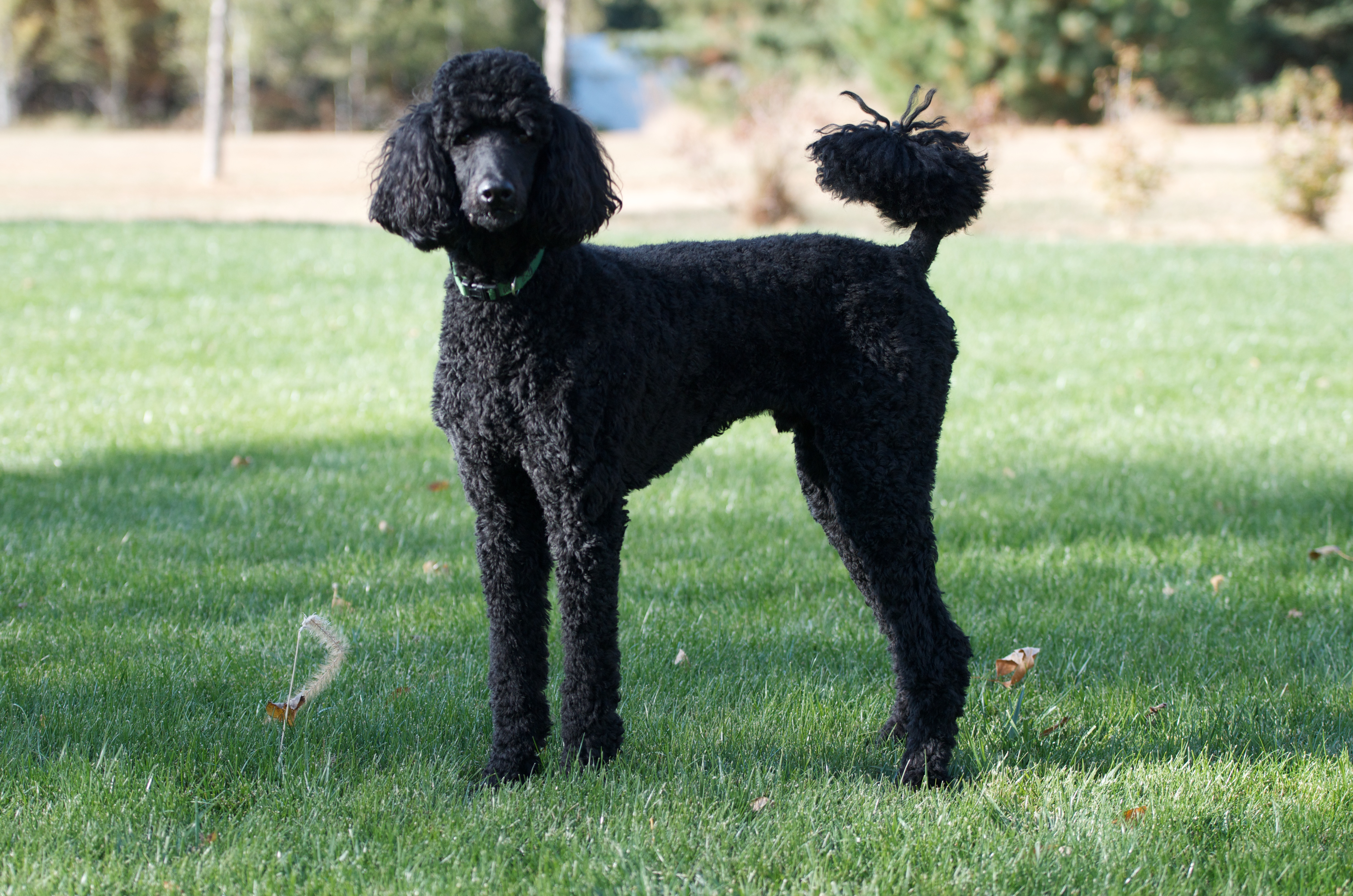
- Other names: German: Pudel; French: Caniche
- Origin: Germany or France (see history)
Traits
- Height: Standard: 45–62 cm (18–24 in); Medium: 35–45 cm (14–18 in); Miniature: 28–35 cm (11–14 in); Toy: 24–28 cm (9.4–11.0 in)
- Weight: Standard: 20–32 kg (44–71 lb); Medium: 9–13 kg (20–29 lb); Miniature: 4.5–7 kg (9.9–15.4 lb); Toy: 2–3 kg (4.4–6.6 lb)
- Coat: Curly
- Colour: White, fawn, brown, grey, black, brindle, black&fawn, brown&fawn, bicolour and tricolour
Kennel club standards
- Société Centrale Canine: standard
- The Royal Kennel Club: standard
- Fédération Cynologique Internationale: standard

The Poodle, called the Pudel in German (German: [ˈpuːdl̩]) and the Caniche in French, is a breed of water dog. The breed is divided into four varieties based on size, the Standard Poodle, Medium Poodle, Miniature Poodle and Toy Poodle, although the Medium Poodle is not universally recognised. They have a distinctive thick, curly coat that comes in many colours and patterns, with only solid colours recognised by major breed registries. Poodles are active and intelligent, and are particularly able to learn from humans. Poodles tend to live 10–18 years, with smaller varieties tending to live longer than larger ones.

The Poodle likely originated in Germany, although the Fédération Cynologique Internationale (FCI, International Canine Federation) and a minority of cynologists believe it originated in France. Similar dogs date back to at least the 17th century. Larger Poodles were originally used by wildfowl hunters to retrieve game from water, while smaller varieties were once commonly used as circus performers. Poodles were recognised by both the Kennel Club of the United Kingdom and the American Kennel Club (AKC) soon after the clubs' founding. Since the mid-20th century, Poodles have enjoyed enormous popularity as pets and show dogs – Poodles were the AKC's most registered breed from 1960 to 1982, and are now the FCI's third most registered breed. Poodles are also common at dog shows, where they often sport the popularly recognised Continental clip, with face and rear clipped close, and tufts of hair on the hocks and tail tip.

== History ==
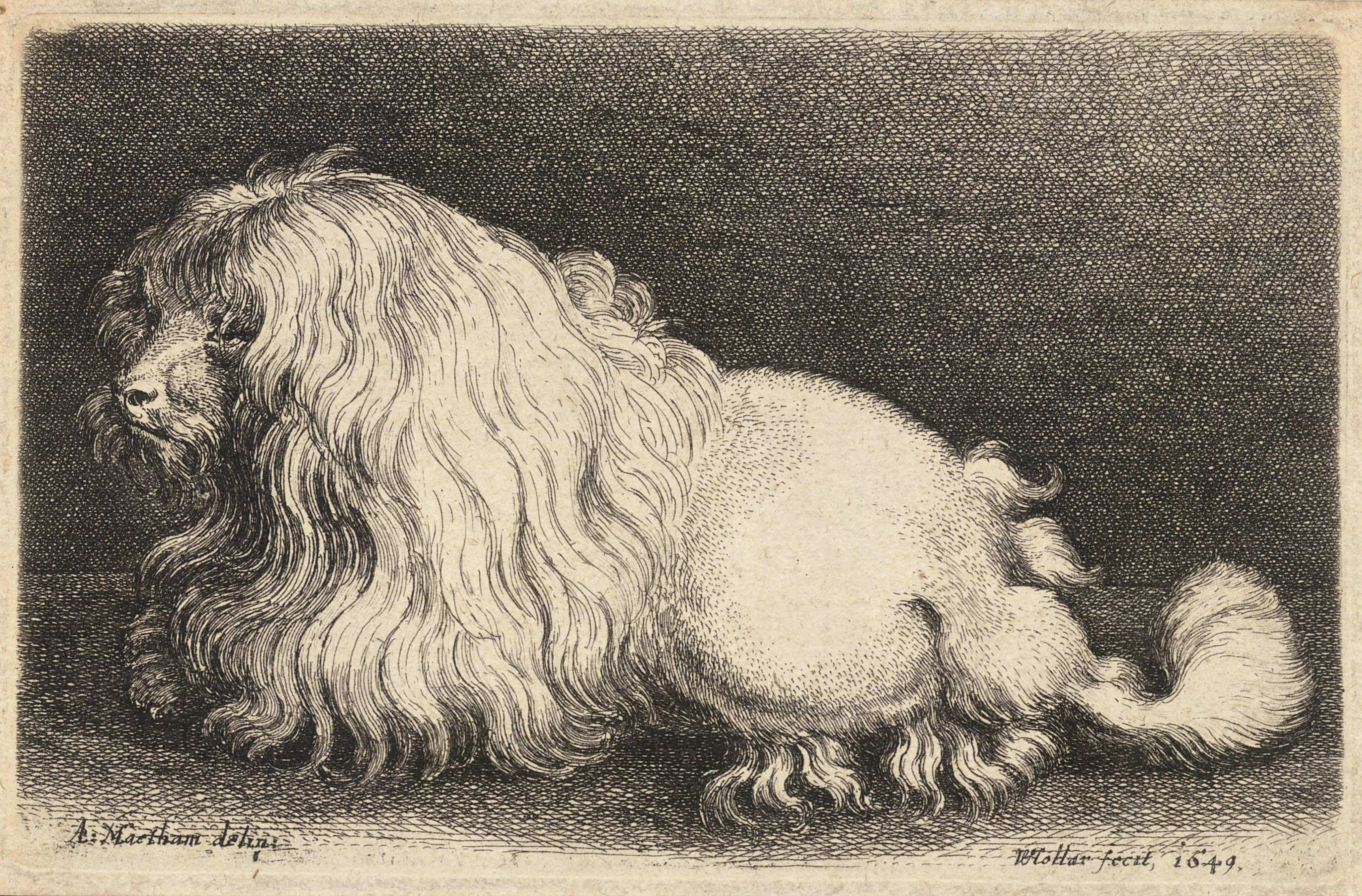
A 17th-century engraving of a Poodle

Most cynologists believe the Poodle originated in Germany in the Middle Ages, from a dog similar to today's Standard Poodle. The Poodle was Germany's water dog, just as England had the English Water Spaniel, France the Barbet, Ireland the Irish Water Spaniel and the Netherlands the Wetterhoun. Among the evidence used to support this theory is the Germanic name for the breed, Poodle or "Pudel" in German, which is derived from the Low German word "puddeln", meaning "to splash". Numerous works by various German artists from as early as the 17th century depict dogs of recognisably Poodle type. Some cynologists believe the Poodle originated in France, where it is known as the "Caniche" and that the breed descends from the Barbet. This view is shared by the Fédération Cynologique Internationale (FCI, International Canine Federation). Others argue that the breed originated in Russia, Piedmont or Northwest Africa.

Whatever the Poodle's country of origin, both their German and French breed names indicate the modern Poodle's ancestors were widely used by waterfowlers both to retrieve shot game and to recover lost arrows and bolts that had missed their mark.

=== Size variants ===
Due to their intelligence, obedient nature, athleticism and looks poodles were frequently employed in circuses, particularly in France. In French circuses poodles were selectively bred down in size to create what is now known as the miniature poodle, which was known as the toy poodle until 1907, as a smaller sized dog is easier to handle and transport in a travelling circus. As circus performers the variety was frequently seen performing all manner of tricks including walking tightropes, acting out comedies and even performing magic and card tricks.

The Toy Poodle was created at the beginning of the 20th century when breeders again bred Miniature Poodles down in size to create a popular companion dog. Initially, these efforts resulted in disfigured or misshapen pups, as well as pups with behavioural problems, as a result of irresponsible breeding for dwarfed size only. As new breeding practices were adopted, the variety became set as a toy-sized replica of the original. Later attempts to create an even smaller variety, the Teacup Poodle, were unable to overcome serious genetic abnormalities and were abandoned.

The last of the Poodle varieties to be recognised was the Medium Poodle, which in size is mid way in between the Standard and the Miniature Poodle. Not universally recognised by the world's kennel clubs, the Medium Poodle is recognised by the FCI and most Continental European kennel clubs. One of the reasons for creating this fourth size variety may have been a desire to reduce the number of entries of Poodles by variety at conformation shows.

=== Recent history ===
The Poodle was recognised by the Kennel Club of the United Kingdom in 1874, and by the American Kennel Club (AKC) in 1886, soon after the founding of both clubs. In the United States, poodles were unpopular until 1935, when the Poodle Nunsoe Duc de la Terrace won best in show at Westminster. Afterwards, they rapidly gained prominence, becoming the AKC's most registered breed from 1960 to 1982. Since 1935, Poodles have won best in show at Westminster 10 times, the second-most of any breed. As of 2012, the Poodle was the third-most popular FCI registered breed worldwide, after the Labrador Retriever and German Shepherd, with 118,653 new dogs registered per year from the 25 countries surveyed.

== Description ==
=== Appearance ===
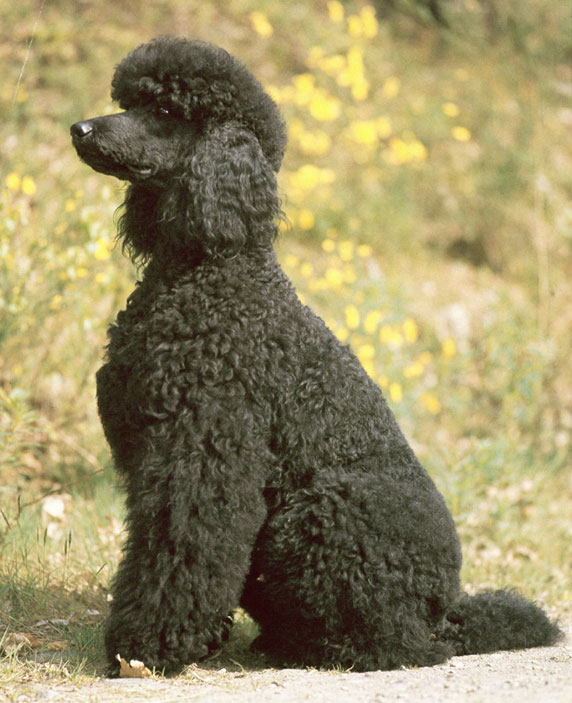
Black Standard Poodle

The Poodle is an active, athletic breed with the varieties differing mostly by size. The FCI's breed standard states the Standard Poodle stands between 45 and 62 centimetres (18 and 24 in), the Medium Poodle between 35 and 45 centimetres (14 and 18 in), the Miniature Poodle between 28 and 35 centimetres (11 and 14 in) and the Toy Poodle 24 and 28 centimetres (9.4 and 11.0 in).

The kennel clubs which do not recognise the Medium Poodle variety typically have the Standard Poodle between 38 and 60 centimetres (15 and 24 in) and Miniature Poodle between 28 and 38 centimetres (11 and 15 in), with the toy variety remaining unchanged.

A healthy adult Standard Poodle typically weighs between 20 and 32 kilograms (44 and 71 lb), a Medium Poodle between 15 and 19 kilograms (33 and 42 lb), a Miniature Poodle between 12 and 14 kilograms (26 and 31 lb) and a Toy Poodle between 6.5 and 7.5 kilograms (14 and 17 lb).

==== Coat ====
Poodles have thick, curly coats with harsh fur. A pet owner can anticipate grooming a Poodle every four to eight weeks.

Poodles are often cited as a hypoallergenic dog breed. Their individual hair follicles have an active growth period that is longer than that of many other breeds; combined with the tightly curled coat, which slows the loss of dander and dead hair by trapping it in the curls, an individual Poodle may release less dander and hair into the environment. However, researchers have generally not found a difference in allergens across breeds.

==== Clips and grooming ====
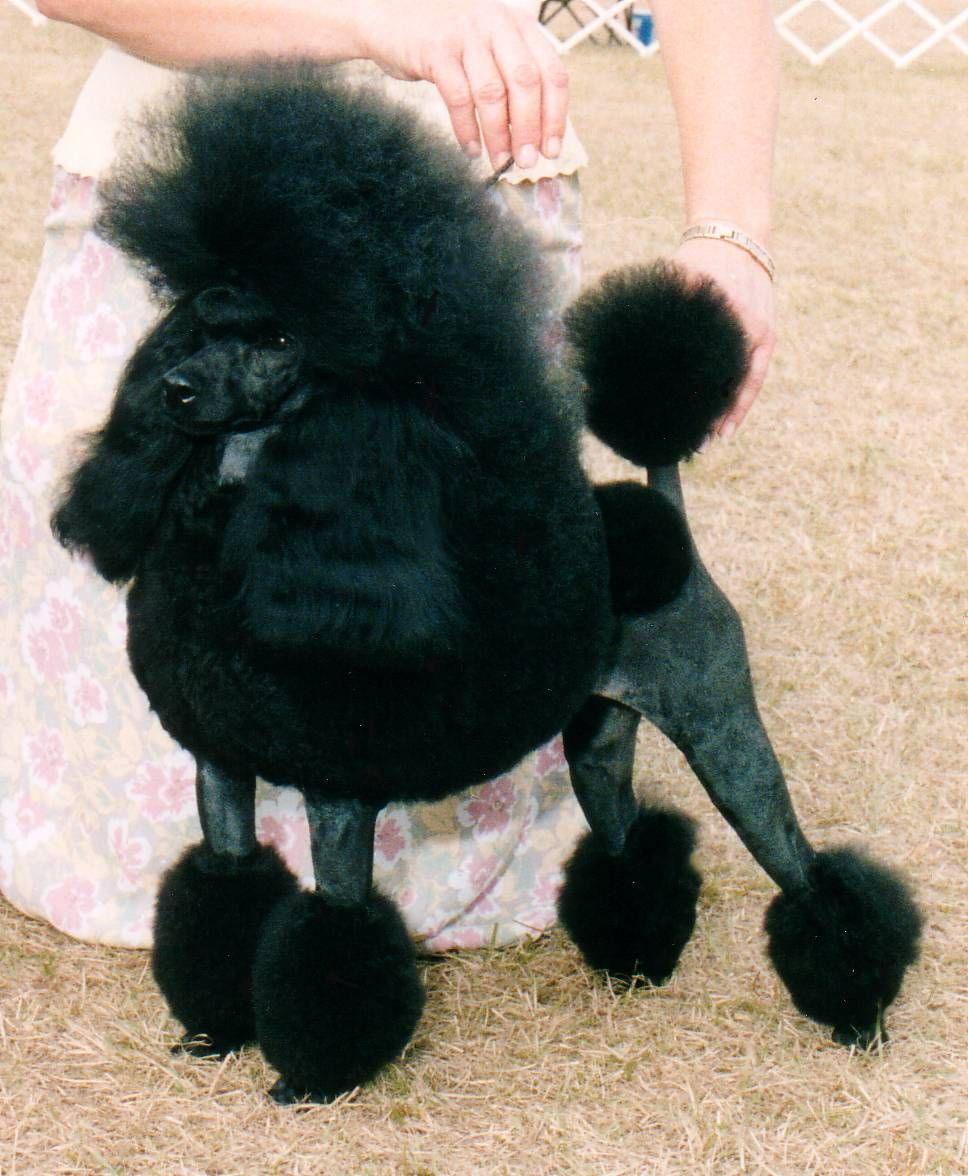
Miniature Poodle with a Continental clip

The FCI and AKC allows Poodles to be shown in the Puppy, Continental (Lion in the FCI standard), English Saddle, or Sporting (Modern) clip. The FCI additionally recognises the Scandinavian clip. The most popular in the show ring is the Continental clip, where the face and rear end of the body are clipped, leaving tufts on the hocks and tip of the tail and rosettes on the hips. A similar clip was historically used to prevent the poodle from getting weighted down by their fur when swimming to retrieve a bird, while still leaving their joints and vital organs covered. Pet poodles are most often clipped similarly to the Sporting clip—evenly over their entire body, with the face and paws cut shorter.

In most cases, whether a Poodle is in a pet or show clip, the hair is completely brushed out. Poodle hair can also be "corded" with rope-like mats similar to those of a Komondor or human dreadlocks. Though once as common as the curly Poodle, corded Poodles are now rare. Corded coats are difficult to keep clean and take a long time to dry after washing. Corded Poodles may be shown in all major kennel club shows.

==== Colours ====
The Poodle has a wide variety of colouring, including white, black, brown, blue, gray, silver, café au lait, silver beige, cream, apricot, and red, and patterns such as parti-, abstract, sable, brindle and phantom. Recognised Fédération Cynologique Internationale colourations are black, white, brown, gray, fawn, brindle, black&fawn, brown&fawn, bicolour and tricolour. Recognition of multi-coloured Poodles varies by registry. They were common historically, but became less popular in the early 1900s, and are excluded from many registries. The American Kennel Club (AKC) recognises Poodles in either solid-coloured and multi-coloured coats; however, only solid-coloured poodles may compete in conformation.

A parti-Poodle has patches of any other solid colour over a primarily white coat. When a parti-coloured Poodle has black-and-white markings that resemble those of a tuxedo, it is called a "tuxedo" Poodle. An abstract Poodle is primarily solid-coloured, with patches of white. Phantom Poodles have a solid main colour with a lighter colour appearing on their "eyebrows", muzzle and throat, legs and feet and below their tail. Phantom Poodles may also have a full face of the secondary colour.

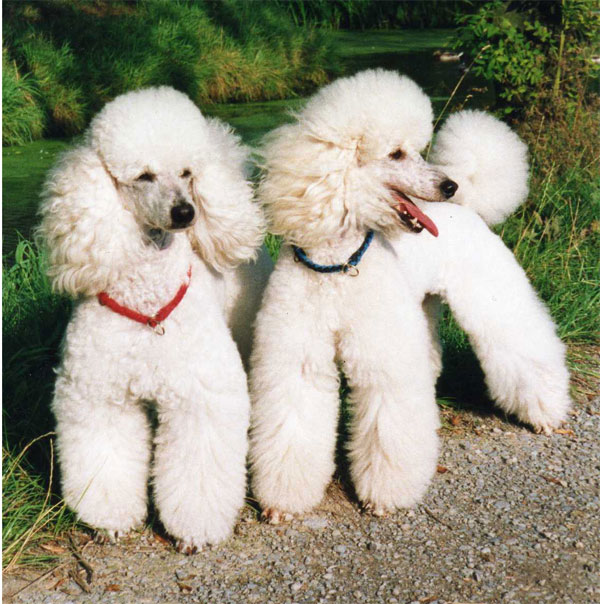
White Poodles

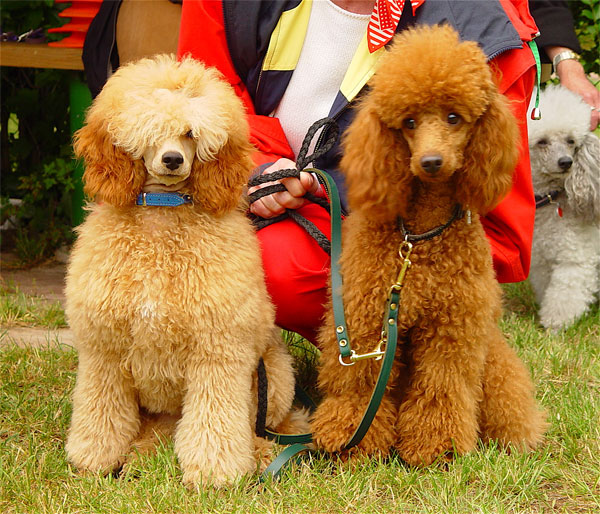
Apricot and red Poodles

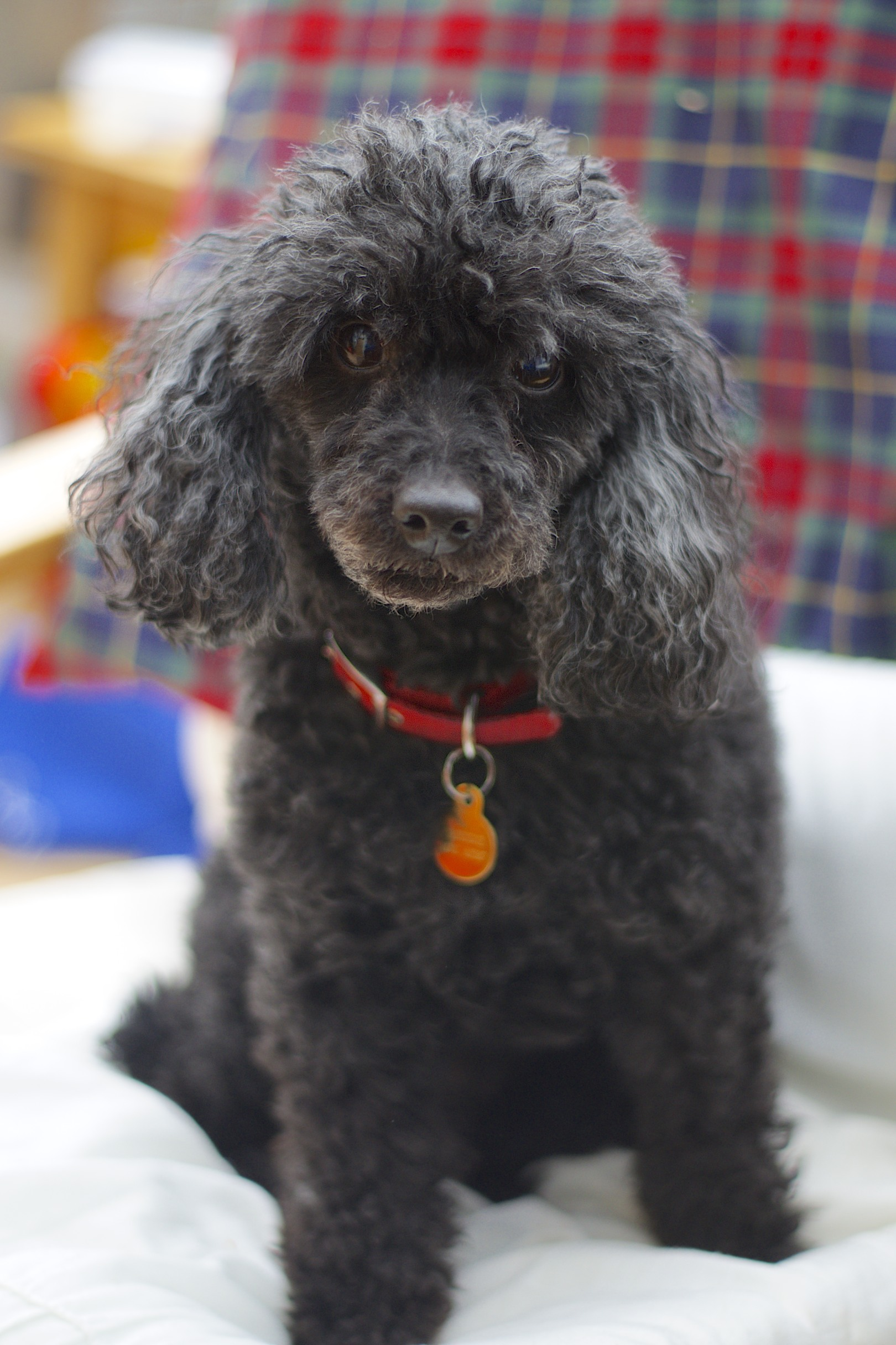
Black Poodle

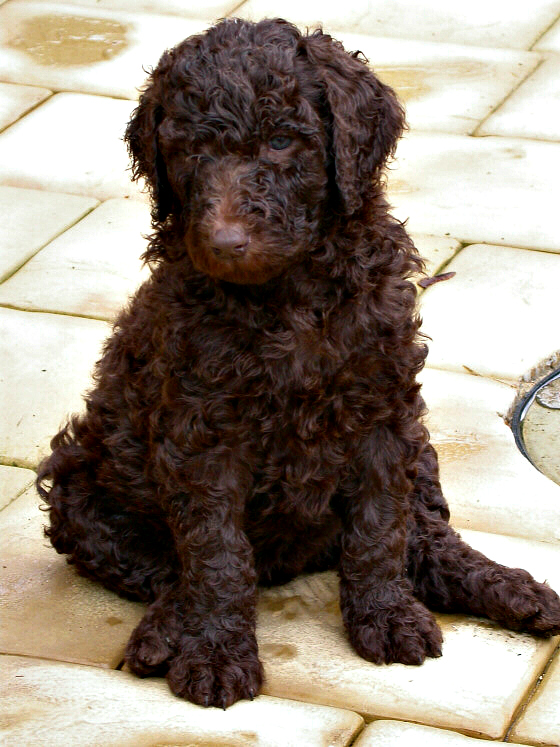
Brown Standard Poodle at five weeks

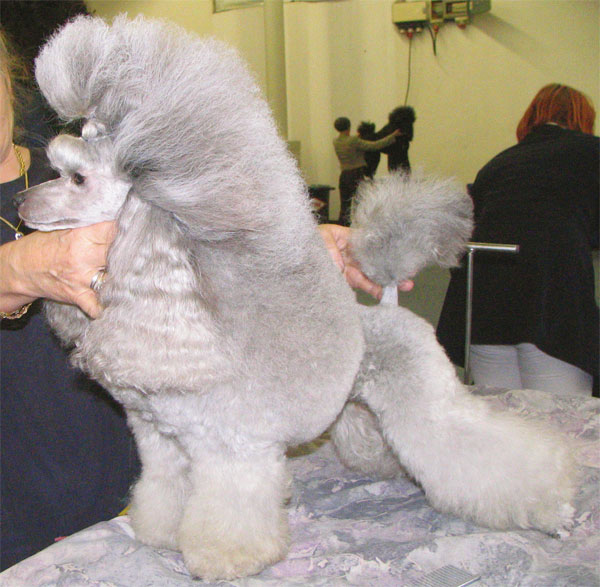
Mature silver Poodle

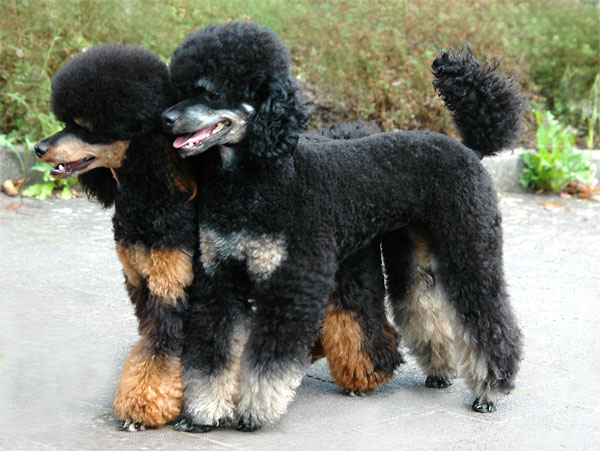
Phantom Poodles

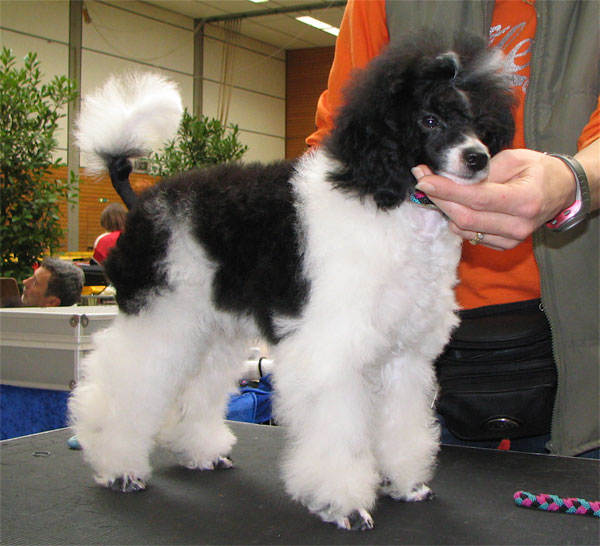
Miniature parti-Poodle

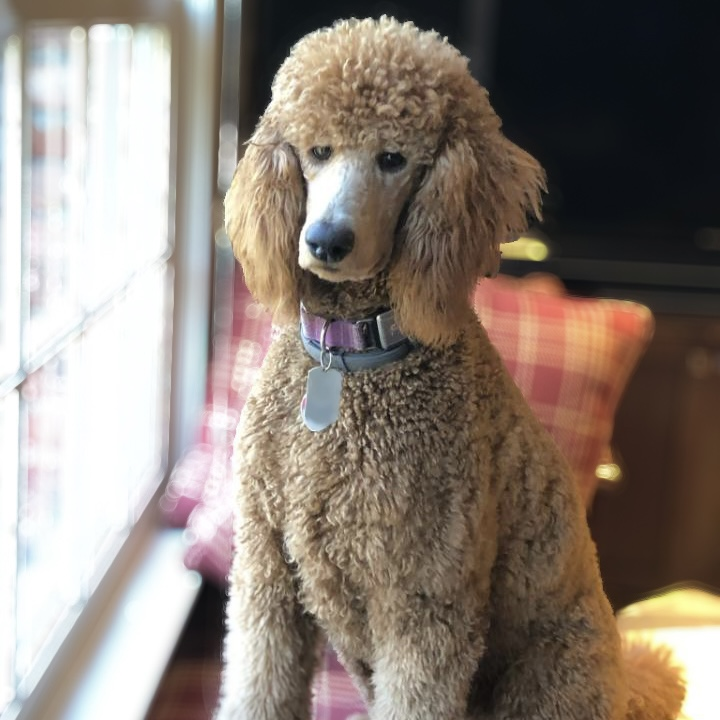
Café au Lait Standard Poodle

=== Temperament ===
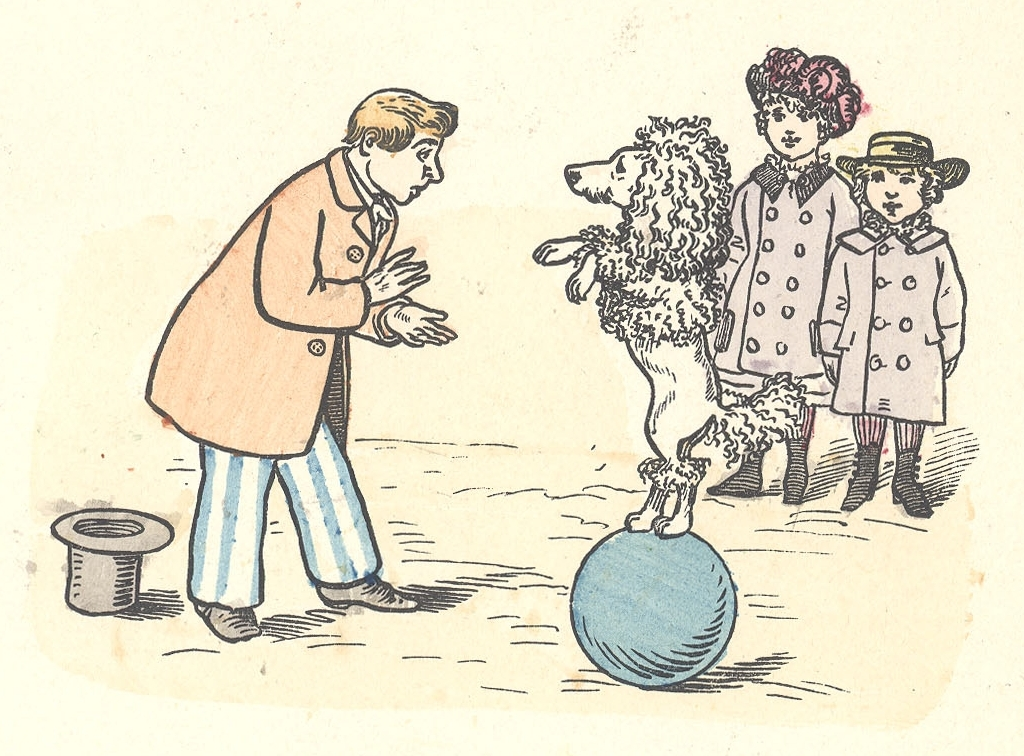
Illustration to Franz Bonn's poem Der Pudel, c. 1900, which describes a Poodle's intellect and loyalty. The respective verse: "when one is clever by nature, one becomes an artist through training".

Poodles are a highly intelligent, energetic, and sociable breed. A 1994 book by Stanley Coren ranked them second out of 130 breeds in "working and obedience intelligence", a measure of their ability to learn from humans. Shyness or sharpness is considered a serious fault in the breed.

== Health ==
The life expectancy of the Poodle varies based on size, as smaller dogs live longer than larger dogs. A study in Japan found the Toy Poodle to have a life expectancy of 12.7 years. A 2024 UK study found a life expectancy of 14 years for the breed compared to an average of 12.7 for purebreeds and 12 for crossbreeds. A 2005 Swedish study found 25% of miniature and toy Poodles died by the age of 10, less than the overall rate of 35% of dogs dying by the age of 10.

Poodles suffer from a number of hereditary diseases. The Poodle Health Registry lists over 50 major health disorders of Standard Poodles. Some of the worst common hereditary poodle diseases are the skin disease sebaceous adenitis (estimated prevalence 2.7%) and Addison's disease, an endocrine system disorder. Both diseases became more prevalent in poodles after the 1960s burst in poodle popularity led to rapid breeding aimed at producing good show dogs. The breeding focused on a small number of popular bloodlines, creating a genetic bottleneck. One study estimated that two average Standard Poodles are about as closely related as the offspring of two full sibling village dogs.

The Poodle is predisposed to the following dermatological conditions: allergic skin disease, alopecia X or follicular arrest, injection site alopecia, otitis externa, melanoma, and sebaceous adenitis.

The Poodle is predisposed to hypothyroidism and Cushing's syndrome.

The Poodle is one of the more commonly affected breeds for progressive rod-cone degeneration. An autosomal recessive mutation in the PRCD gene is responsible for the condition in the breed.

== Work and sport ==
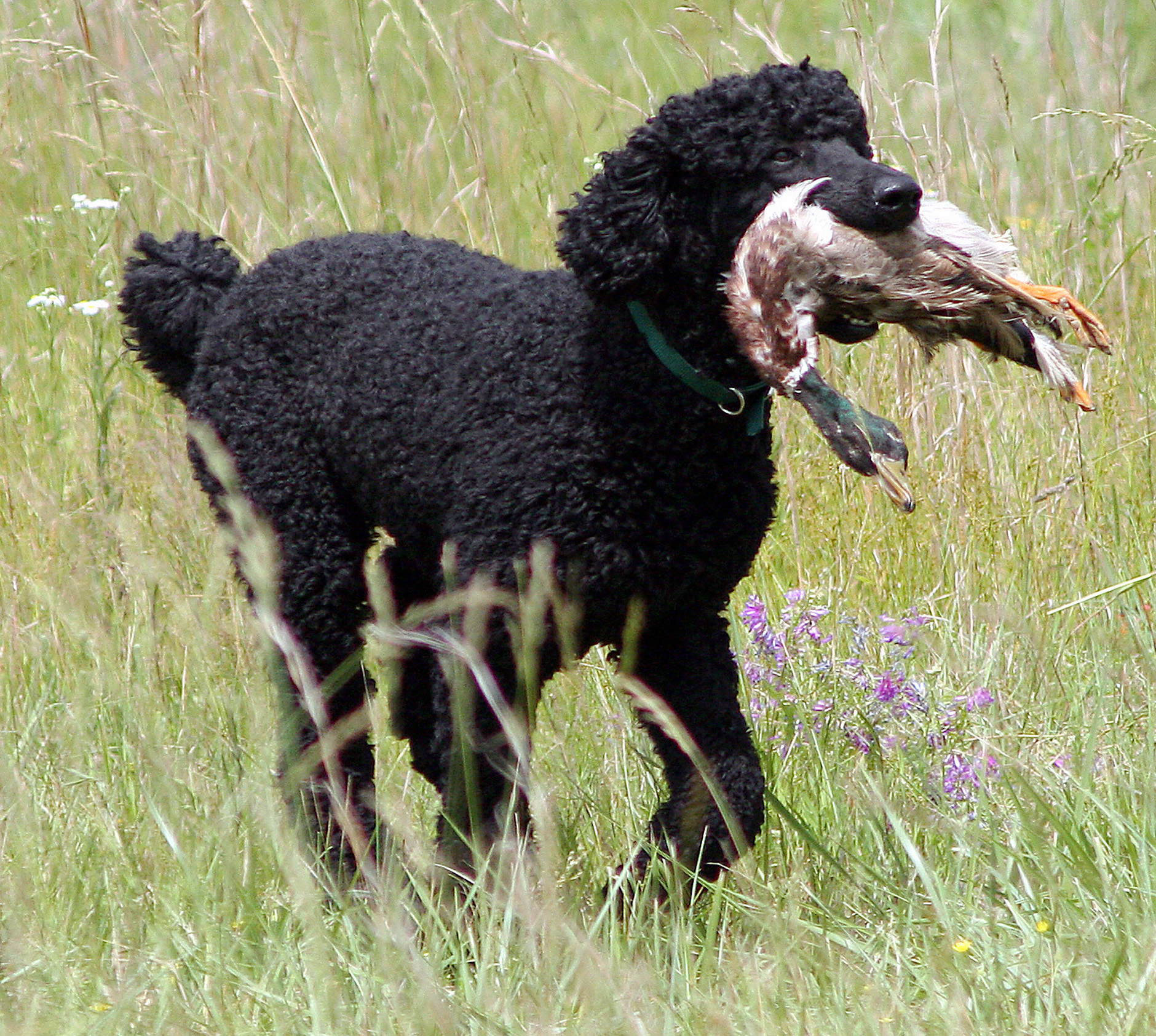
Poodle retrieving a duck

Poodles were originally bred for waterfowl hunting. Despite this history, they are currently classified as companion dogs by the FCI. Since the late 1980s, some breeders in the United States and Canada have been selecting for dogs with drive for birds in order to revive the breed for hunting, with some success. Poodles are highly trainable dogs that typically excel in obedience training. Historically, they were a popular circus dog. In addition to hunt tests, they do well in agility and rally. They are among the most popular service dog breeds.

Poodles have been used as working dogs in the military since at least the 17th century, most likely because of their highly intelligent, trainable nature. Their background as a hunting dog makes them suitable to battlefields, and they can be trained to ignore gunfire. During the English Civil War, Prince Rupert of the Rhine had a famous hunting Poodle who would ride into battle with his master on horseback. Napoleon Bonaparte wrote in his memoirs about the faithfulness of a grenadier's pet Poodle who stayed with the body of his master at the Battle of Marengo.

== Cultural references ==
The perceived passive and obedient nature of the breed has led to use in politics of "poodle" as a political pejorative to assert the sycophancy of a politician who obediently or passively follows the lead of others. It is considered to be equivalent to lackey. The term was used as a label to criticise British Prime Ministers who are perceived to be too close to the United States. During the 2000s, it was used against Tony Blair with regard to his close relationship with George W. Bush and the involvement of the United Kingdom in the Iraq War. The singer George Michael used it in his song "Shoot the Dog" in July 2002, the video of which showed Blair as the "poodle" on the lawn of the White House. Romanian-Israeli politician Colette Avital unsuccessfully tried to have the term's use banned from the Knesset in June 2001. By extension, the phrase "attack poodle" has been used to denote a particularly vociferous but servile defender of a given political leader, party, or faction. It gained popular currency in 2002 when Paul Marsden a member of the British Parliament who ran afoul of the Labour party Chief Whip Hilary Armstrong charged that Prime Minister Tony Blair was setting out "one of his attack poodles" to bring him or her into line. The term was further popularised by the American culture critic James Wolcott in his 2004 book, Attack Poodles and Other Media Mutants.

== See also ==
- Cockapoo
- Goldendoodle
- Havapoo
- Labradoodle
- List of dog breeds
