= Akita-ken =

Akita-ken may refer to:

- Akita Prefecture, Japan
- Akita (dog breed)
