= Akita (dog breed) =

Akita Inu
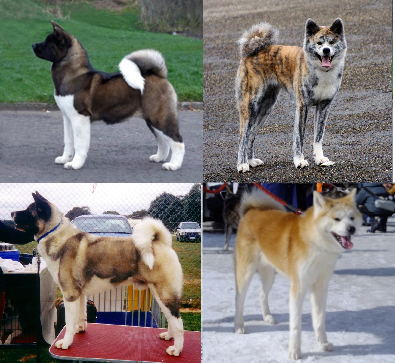
- Other names: Akita Inu; Akita Ken; Japanese Akita; Great Japanese Dog
- Origin: Japan
Traits
| Height | Males | 64–71 cm (25–28 in) |
| | Females | 58–66 cm (23–26 in) |
| Weight | Males | 27–59 kg (60–130 lb) |
| | Females | 25–45 kg (55–100 lb) |
- Coat: Double coat
- Colour: Red, brindle, white. All with white fur on the ventral areas of the dog (urajiro).
- Litter size: 3–12 puppies (avg. 7–8)
Kennel club standards
- Akita Inu Hozonkai: standard
- Japan Kennel Club: standard standard
- Fédération Cynologique Internationale: standard standard

The Akita Inu (秋田犬, Akita inu, Akitaken; Japanese pronunciation: [ä̀.kʲi̥.tä́ ì.nɨ̀, -í.nɨ́, -ké̞ɴ́]) is a Japanese working dog breed of large size. Originating from the mountains of northern Japan, the Akita has a short double coat similar to that of many other northern spitz breeds. The breed traces its roots to the Matagi Inu, a chūgata ken (medium-sized dog) historically used by the Matagi—traditional hunters of the Tōhoku region—for tracking and subduing large game such as tsukinowaguma (Japanese black bear), inoshishi (wild boar) and kamoshika (Japanese serow) in snow-covered mountain terrain.

As a breed, Akitas are generally hardy. However, it is subject to debate as to whether the Akita strains are distinct, or if they constitute one breed.

== Breed name ==
Outside of Japan, debate exists among fanciers whether these are two separate breeds of Akitas. As of 2020, the American Kennel Club now considers American and Japanese Akitas to be two separate breeds, no longer allowing free breeding between the two. The United Kennel Club, the Federation Cynologique Internationale (FCI), The Kennel Club, the Australian National Kennel Council, the New Zealand Kennel Club, and the Japan Kennel Club consider Japanese and American Akitas as separate breeds. Some countries refer to the American Akita as simply the Akita and not the American Akita. The issue is especially controversial in Japan. For the FCI's 84 countries, the breed split formally occurred in June 1999, when the FCI decided that the American type would be called the Great Japanese Dog, later renamed the American Akita in January 2006.

== History ==
=== Japanese history ===
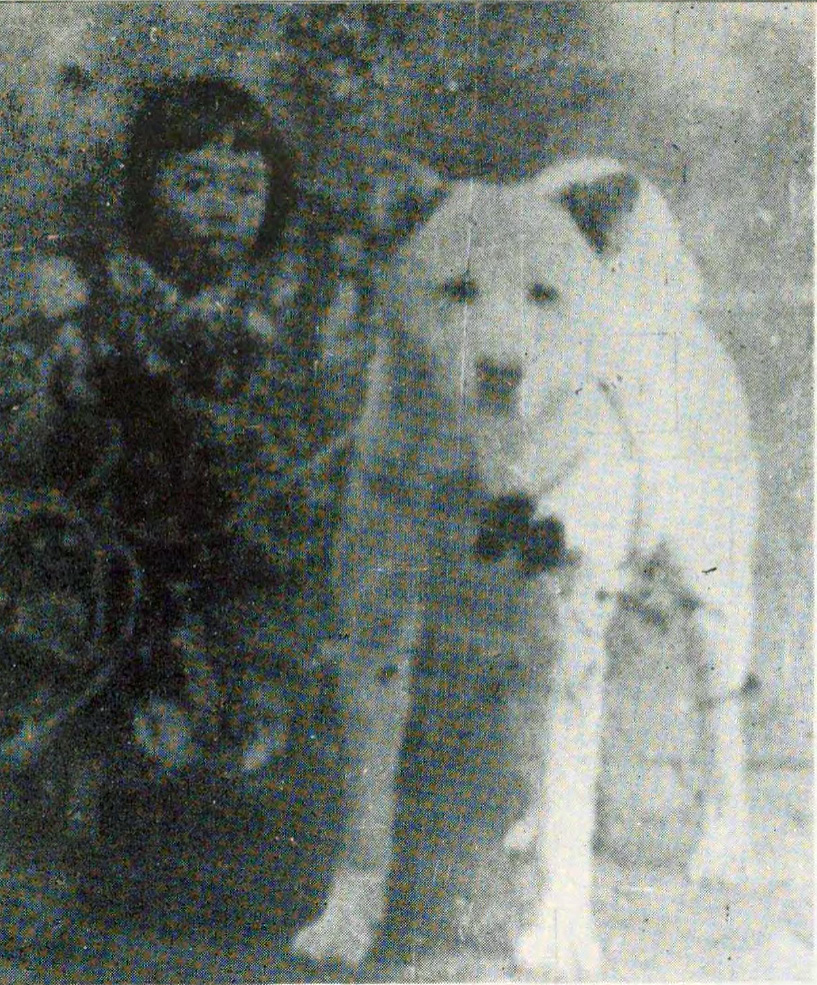
Akita Inu photographed around 1907

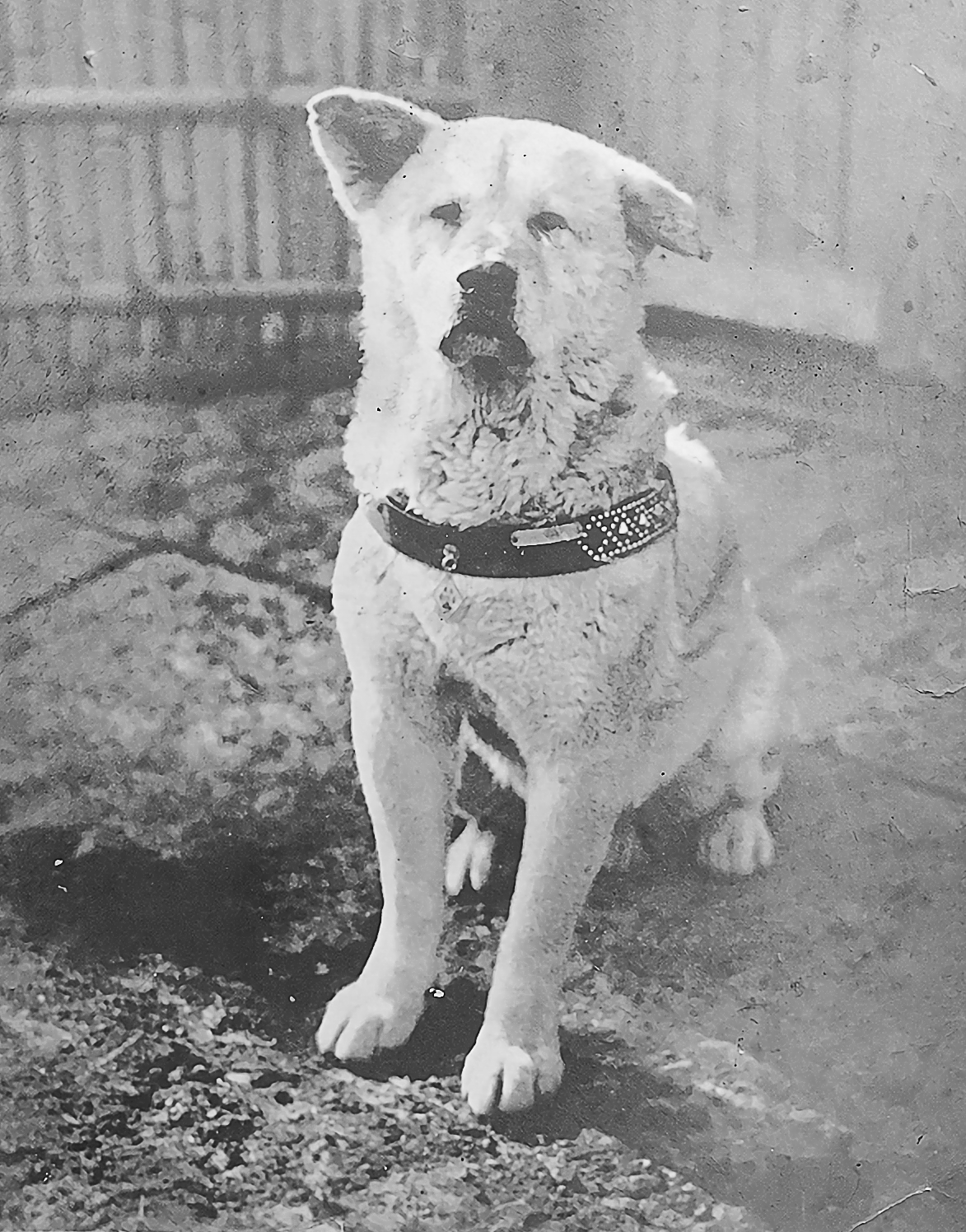
Hachikō

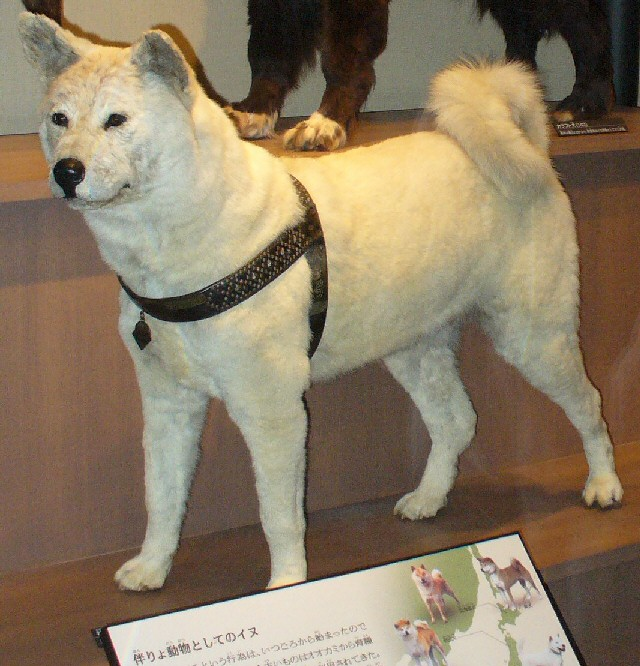
Loyal Hachikō became legendary after waiting every day for his master to return at Shibuya Station in central Tokyo.

The direct ancestor of the Akita Inu was a dog kept as a guard dog and fighting dog by samurai and wealthy farmers in the Ōdate area, and was known as the Ōdate dog (大館犬) until 1931 when it was renamed the Akita Inu. Since ancient times, hunting dogs called matagi dogs (マタギ犬) were kept in the Tōhoku region of northern Japan. The word matagi means hunter. The main targets of hunting were Asian black bears, Japanese serows, Japanese macaques, and rabbits. In Akita Prefecture, there was also a matagi dog called the Akita Matagi Inu (秋田マタギ犬), which is a medium-sized dog and is distinguished from the Akita Inu.

During the Edo period (1603–1867), the Akita region was ruled by the Satake clan of the Kubota Domain. The Satake West Family (佐竹西家), the castle keeper of Ōdate Castle, is said to have nurtured the fighting spirit of its vassals through dogfighting.

It is not known exactly how Akita Inu became larger, but according to a "discussion on dogs by old people" held in 1931 in the then Ōdate Town, a famous dog named "Moku" was kept at the Jō'ō-ji Temple (浄応寺) in Ōdate, commonly known as Naka no Tera Temple (中の寺), in the late Edo period (1603–1867). Moku was a dog born at the end of the Ansei era (1854–1860), lived through the fires of the Boshin War (1868–1869), and lived until 1871 or 1872. Moku was about 85 cm tall at the shoulder and was large enough to carry an adult on its back. Moku was a purely Japanese dog with erect ears and a curly tail, sesame (goma) in color, and long hair. If this theory is to be believed, Akita Inu had become larger by the end of the Edo period at the latest.

In 1931, the Akita was officially declared a Japanese natural monument. The mayor of Odate City in Akita Prefecture organized the Akita Inu Hozonkai to preserve the original Akita as a Japanese natural treasure through careful breeding.

In 1933, Heishiro Takaku (Takahisa), one of the early members of Nippo in Tokyo and later of the Nipponinu Kyokai (Nikkyo) in Osaka and Katsuichi (Shoichi) each published articles on a proposed Japanese dog standard, which Included the Akita dog. Akita dogs revealed the most non-uniformity at that time, when compared to medium and small Japanese dogs, due to being outcrossed to the Tosa fighting dog, and other Imported foreign dogs. In 1934, the first Japanese breed standard for the Akita Inu was listed, following the breed's declaration as a natural monument of Japan.

The Akita breed was used during the Russo-Japanese War to track prisoners of war and lost sailors. During World War II, the Akita was considered a non-military breed and was crossed with German Shepherds in an attempt to save them from the wartime government order for all non-military dogs to be culled. Some were used as scouts and guards during the war.

A native Japanese breed known as Matagi Inu (hunting dog) was used along with the Hokkaido Inu breed to mix back into the remaining Akita dogs to restore the breed. There were many lines of Akita, but the most influential were the Dewa and Ichinoseki. Both lines contributed to the foundation stock for both Akita types, and many exported dogs were a combination of these lines. According to one Japanese judge, the greatest difference between Japanese- and American-bred Akitas is that the latter still show much evidence of the Dewa strain. In the early 1900s, Dewa-line Akitas were heavily favoured and did well in show. Kongo-go (from the Heirakudo Kennel of Eikichi Hiraizumi) is considered to be the most influential dog of that line.

However, the Dewa-line later went into a decline because Japanese breeders felt that the Akita did not give the impression of a Japanese dog, so began to breed towards an ideal type reminiscent of other Nihon-ken. The Dewa line was stereotyped as the “German Shepherd” type, while the Ichinoseki line was referred to as the “Mastiff” type. Thus, the Ichinoseki-line rose in popularity. Goromaru-Go was regarded as the most influential Akita of that line who, although did not perform well in show, produced outstanding Akita dogs when bred to Taihei and Nikkei lines from Southern Akita.

During the occupation years following the war, the breed began to thrive again through the efforts of Sawataishi and others. Morie Sawataishi and his efforts to breed the Akita is a major reason this breed exists today. For the first time, Akitas were bred for a standardized appearance. Akita fanciers in Japan began gathering and exhibiting the remaining Akitas and producing litters to restore the breed to sustainable numbers and to accentuate the ideal characteristics of the breed muddied by crosses to other breeds. It was not until the 1960–1970s where the foxier Japanese type started to diverge from the typical American type.

The story of Hachikō helped push the Akita into the international dog world. Hachikō was born in 1923 and owned by Professor Hidesaburō Ueno of Tokyo. Professor Ueno lived near the Shibuya Train Station in a suburb of the city, and commuted to work every day on the train. Hachikō accompanied his master to and from the station each day. On May 25, 1925, when the dog was 18 months old, he waited for his master's arrival on the four o'clock train, but Professor Ueno had suffered a fatal brain haemorrhage at work. Hachikō continued to wait for his master's return. He travelled to and from the station each day for the next nine years. He allowed the professor's relatives to care for him, but he never gave up the vigil at the station for his master. His vigil became world-renowned when, in 1934, shortly before his death, a bronze statue was erected at the Shibuya train station in his honor. This statue was melted down for munitions during the war, but a new one was commissioned after the war. Each year on March 8 since 1936, Hachikō's devotion has been honoured with a solemn ceremony of remembrance at Tokyo's Shibuya railroad station. Eventually, Hachikō's legendary faithfulness became a national symbol of loyalty, particularly to the person and institution of the Emperor.

In 1967, commemorating the 50th anniversary of the founding of Akita Inu Hozonkai (AKIHO, Akita Dog Preservation Society), the Akita Dog Museum was built to house information, documents and photos.

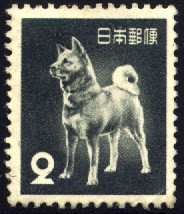
The Akita "Tachibana", one of the few Akitas to survive the war, is pictured here on a Japanese 1953-issue postage stamp.

In 1937, Helen Keller travelled to Japan. She expressed a keen interest in the breed and was presented with the first two Akitas to enter the US. The first dog, presented to her by Mr. Ogasawara and named Kamikaze-go, died at 7 1/2 months of age from distemper, one month after her return to the States. A second Akita was arranged to be sent to Keller: Kamikaze's litter brother, Kenzan-go. Keller nicknamed the dog Go-Go and they were great companions from day one. Go-Go even spent his first night at Keller's home sleeping at the foot of her bed. Kenzan-go died in the mid-1940s. By 1939, a breed standard had been established and dog shows had been held, but such activities stopped after World War II began. Keller wrote in the Akita Journal:

If ever there was an angel in fur, it was Kamikaze. I know I shall never feel quite the same tenderness for any other pet. The Akita dog has all the qualities that appeal to me he is gentle, companionable and trusty.

=== American history ===
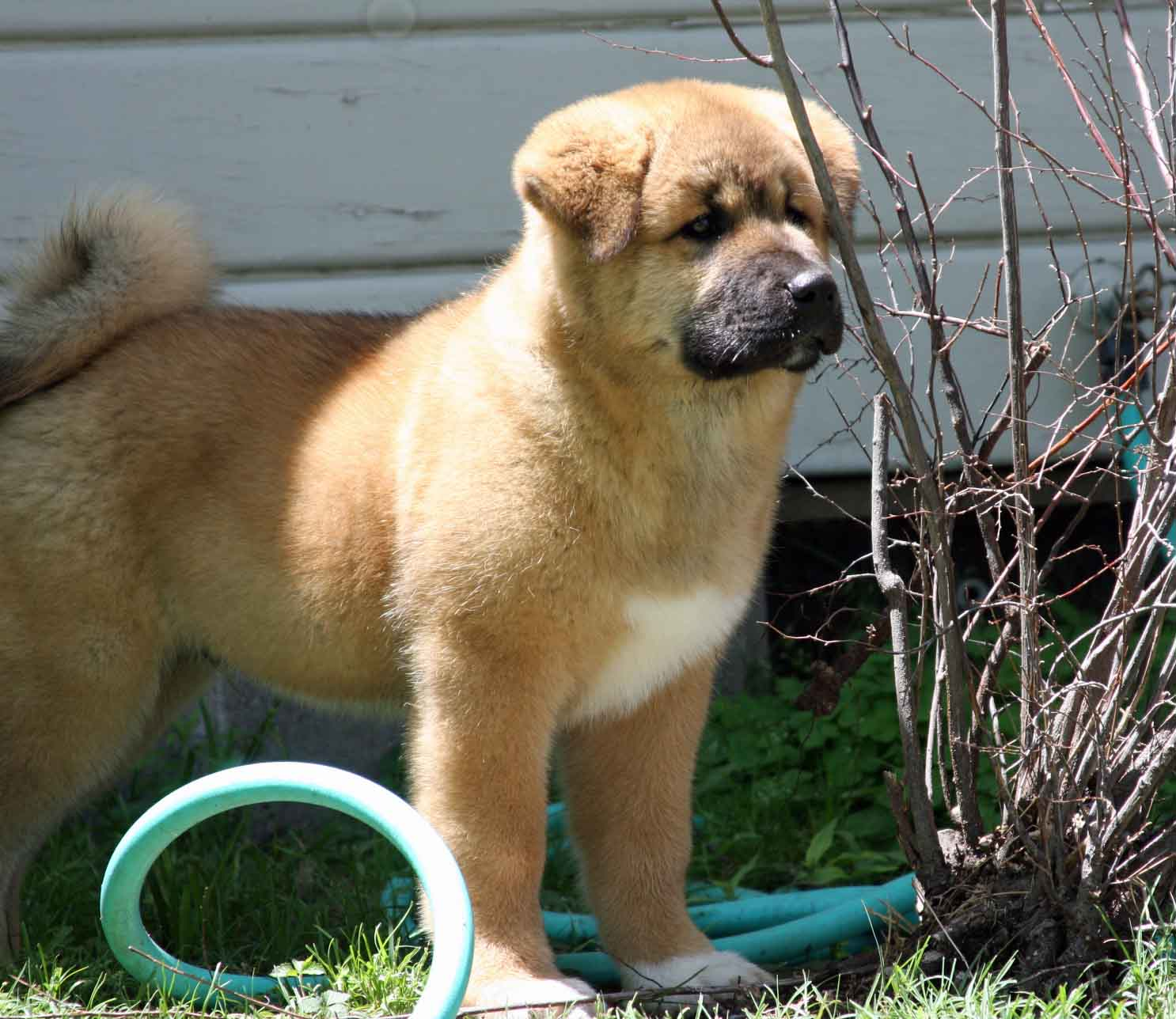
A 9-week-old American Akita

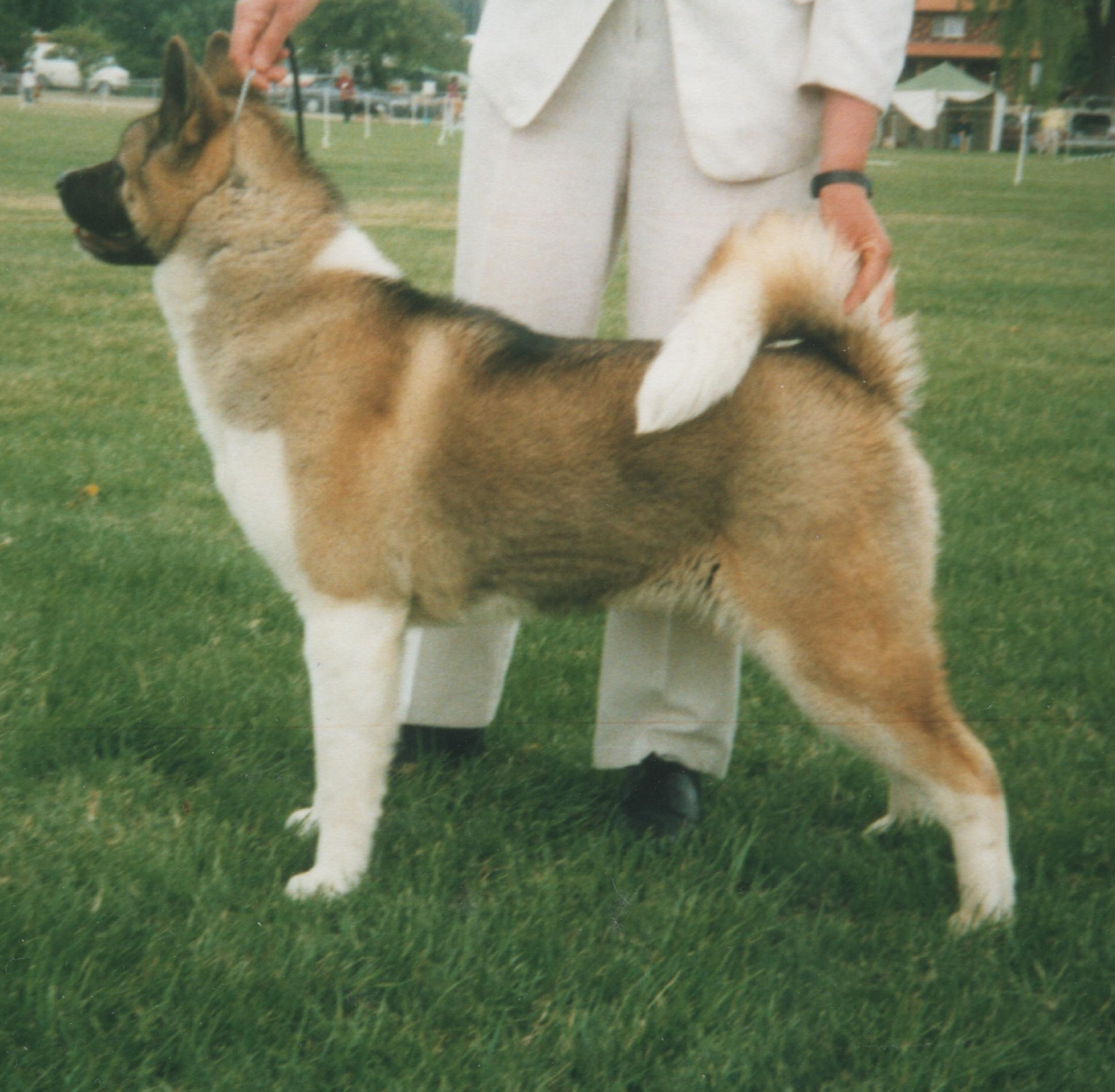
A female American Akita

The Japanese Akita and American Akita began to diverge in type post-World War II due to America and Europe preserving the Akitas that fell out of favour in Japan, particularly the Dewa-types and dogs with the signature black mask or pinto marking. American Akitas are typically considered mixed by Japanese breeders (and not true Akitas by the Japanese standard). However, their phenotype predates the Japanese Akita by a few decades, and they are closer to pre-war Akitas like Hachiko.

Helen Keller is credited with bringing the Akita to America after being given two Akitas by the Japanese government in 1938. By 1939, a breed standard was established, and dog shows began to be held, but this development was interrupted by World War II. During this time, US servicemen serving as part of the occupation force in Japan first came into contact with the Akita. The breed so impressed them that many service members chose to bring an Akita back home with them upon completion of their tour.

Although both types derive from common ancestry, marked differences are seen between the two. American Akitas generally are heavier boned and larger, with a more bear-like head, whereas Japanese Akitas tend to be lighter and more finely featured with a fox-like head. Additionally, while American Akitas are acceptable in all colors, Japanese Akitas are only permitted to be red, white, or brindle. Additionally, American Akitas may be pinto and/or have black masks, unlike Japanese Akitas, where these are considered disqualifications and are not permitted in the breed standards.

Recognized by the American Kennel Club in 1955, the Akita was placed in the Miscellaneous class. The AKC did not approve the Akita standard until 1972, and it was moved to the Working Dog class. As such, the Akita is a rather new breed in the United States. Foundation stock in America continued to be imported from Japan until 1974, when the AKC cut off registration to any further Japanese imports until 1992, when it recognized the Japan Kennel Club standards. This decision set the stage for the divergence in type between the American Akita and Japanese Akita Inu that is present today.

Elsewhere in the world, one American Akita was first introduced to the UK in 1937. He was a Canadian import, owned by a Mrs. Jenson; the descendants of Mrs. Jenson live on today breeding American Akitas. The most widely known of these is Joseph Felton, an award-winning Akita breeder, but the breed was not itself widely known until the early 1980s. The breed was introduced in Australia in 1982 with an American import and to New Zealand in 1986 with an import from the UK.

== Gallery ==
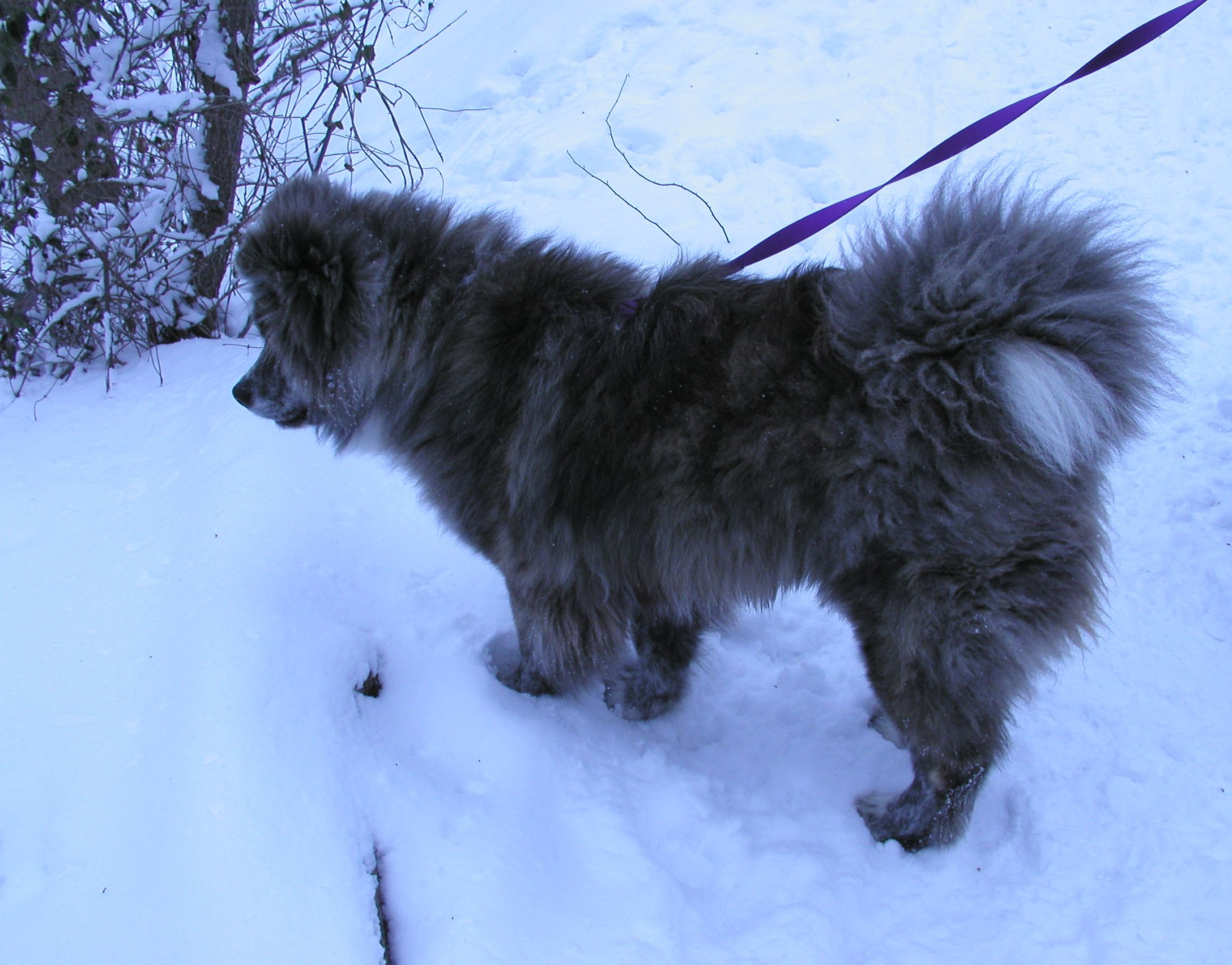
Long-coat Akita

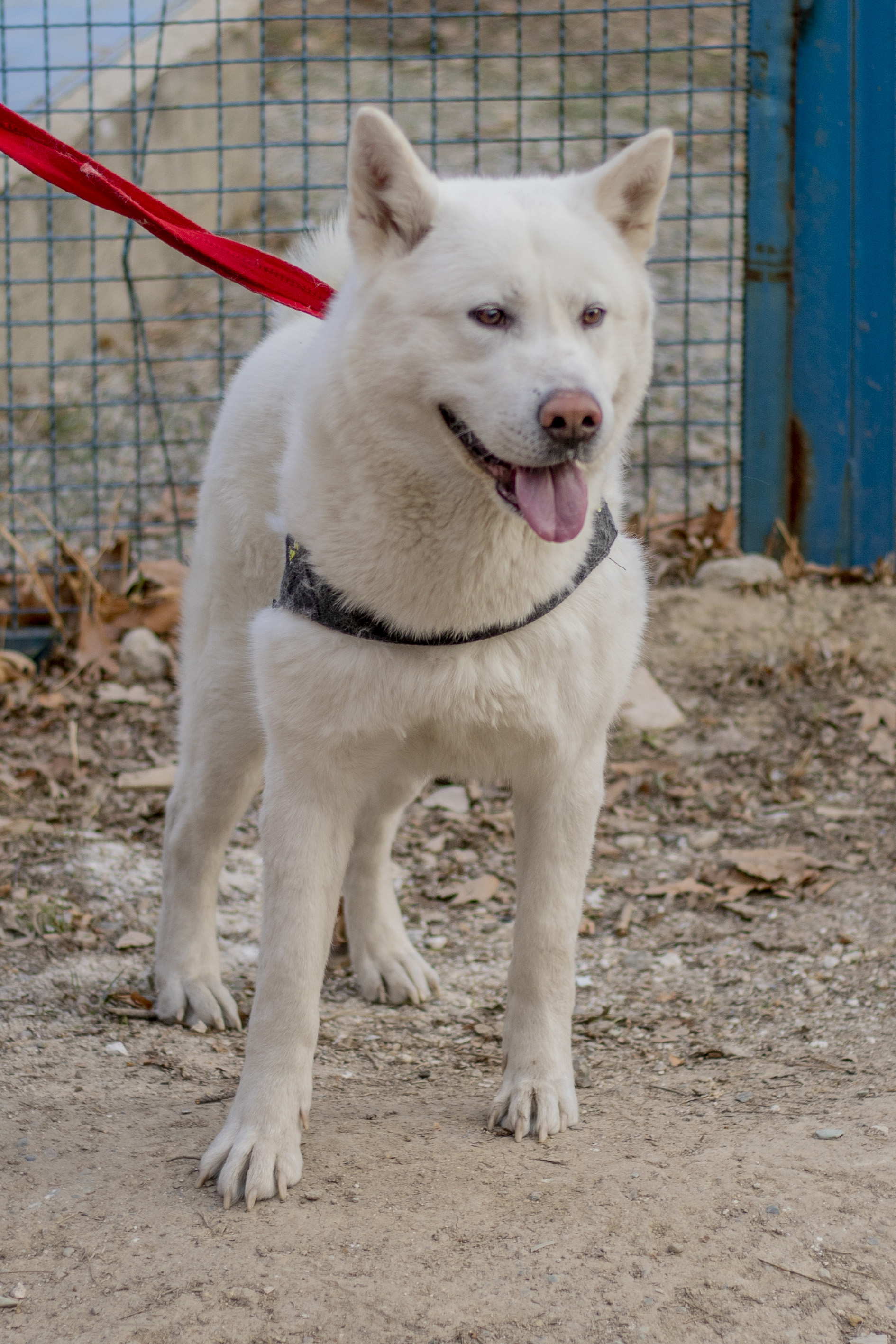
White Akita

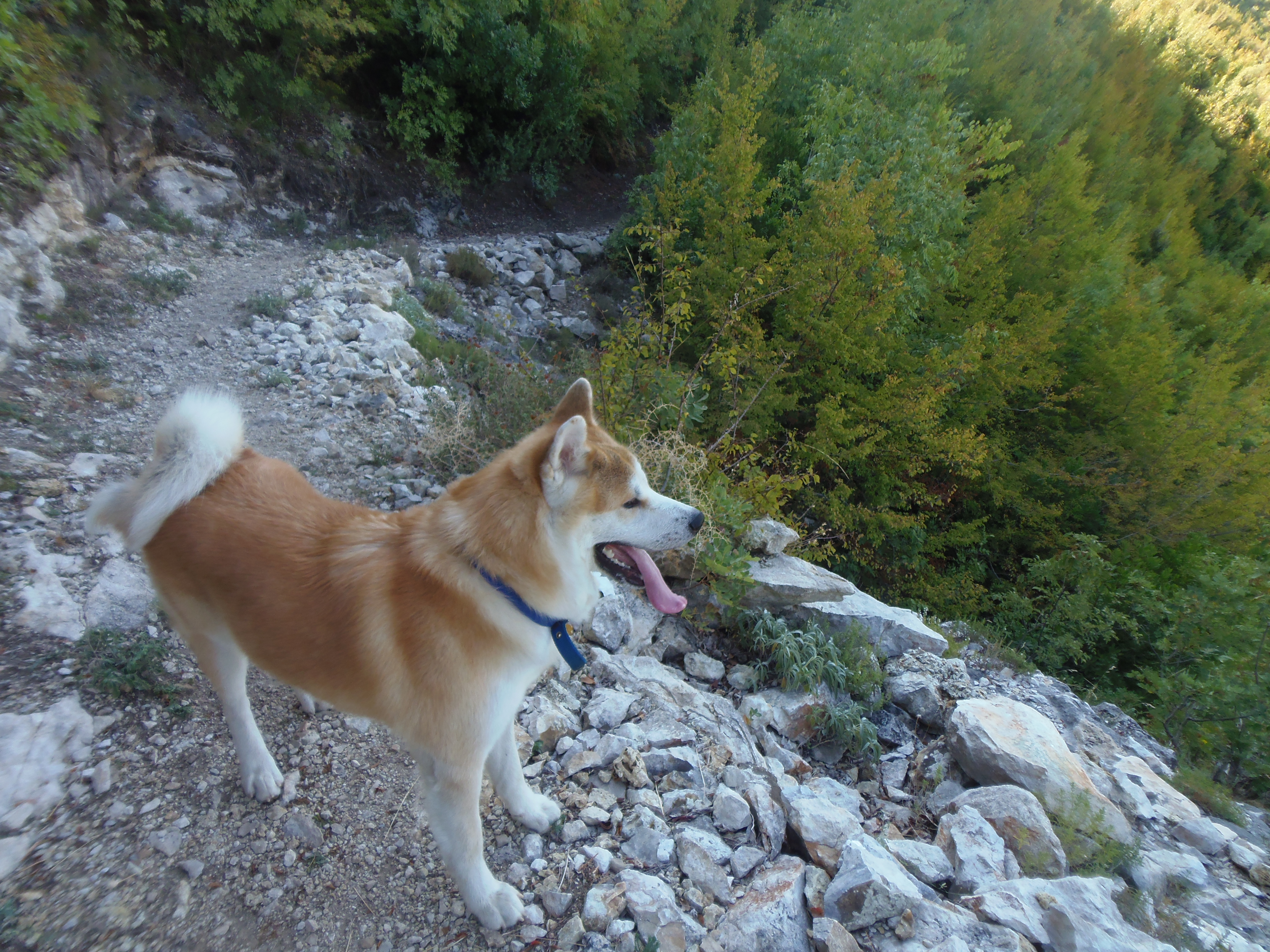
Akita hiking in Shpella e Pëllumbasit, Tirana, Albania

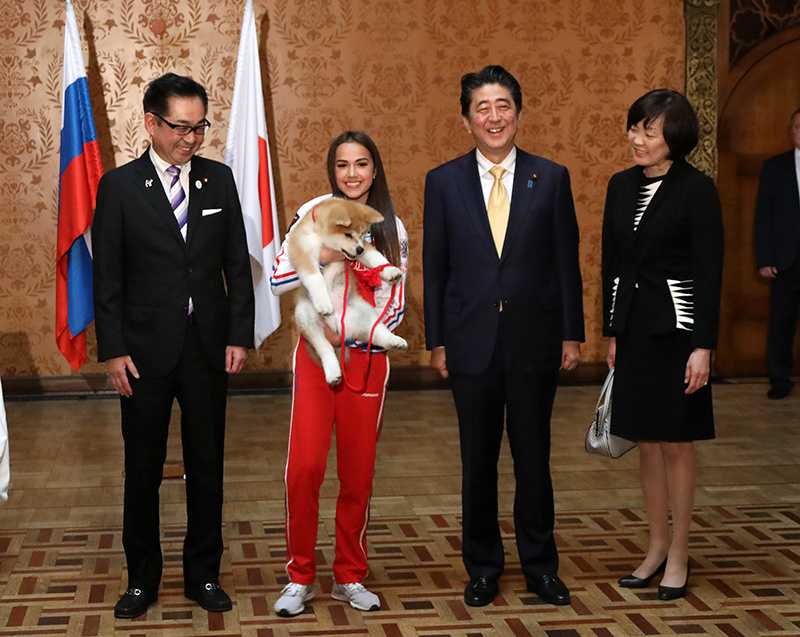
Olympic figure-skating champion Alina Zagitova receiving an Akita Inu puppy called Masaru in a ceremony attended by Prime Minister Shinzō Abe and AKIHO President Takashi Endō.

=== Appearance ===
As a spitz breed, the appearance of the Akita reflects cold-weather adaptations essential to their original function. The Akita is a substantial breed for its height with heavy bones. Characteristic physical traits of the breed include a large, bear-like head with erect, triangular ears set at a slight angle following the arch of the neck. Additionally, the eyes of the Akita are small, dark, deeply set, and triangular in shape. Akitas have thick double coats, and tight, well-knuckled, cat-like feet. Their tails are carried over the tops of their backs in a gentle or double curl down the loin.

Mature American-type males measure typically 26-28 in (66–71 cm) at the withers and weigh between 100 and 130 lb (45–59 kg). Mature females typically measure 24-26 in (61–66 cm) and weigh between 70 and 100 lb (32–45 kg). The Japanese type, as stated in the breed standards, is a little smaller and lighter.

Breed standards state that all dog breed coat colors and patterns are allowable in the American Akita. This includes the common Shiba Inu coloring pattern known as urajiro. The Japanese Akitas, as per the breed standards, are restricted to red, fawn, sesame, brindle, and pure white, all with urajiro markings - whitish coat on the sides of the muzzle, on the cheeks, on the underside of jaw, neck, chest, body, and tail, and on the inside of the legs.

=== Coat types ===
The two coat types in the Akita are the standard coat length and the long coat. The long coat is considered a fault in the show ring, however. The long coat, also known as moku, is the result of an autosomal recessive gene and may occur phenotypically only if both sire and dam are carriers. They have longer (about 3-4 in long) and softer coats and are known to have sweeter temperaments. This gene is thought to come from the Karafuto Ken dog.

== Temperament ==
The Akita is generally seen as territorial about its property, and can be reserved with strangers.

The breed has been defined in some countries' breed-specific legislation as a dangerous dog. The Akita is a large, strong, independent, and dominant dog. A well-trained Akita should be accepting of nonthreatening strangers, otherwise they treat all strangers in an aggressive manner.

A survey on canine behaviour in five 'ancient' breeds in Poland found the Akita to be the most aggressive towards other dogs with 59% of Akitas being reported to display aggression towards other dogs and animals. They were the second most likely to be aggressive towards humans with 13% of Akitas being reported to display aggression towards humans. Stereotypic behaviour was reported in 27% of Akitas, ranking it second out of the five breeds surveyed. Excessive vocalisation was only reported at 17% for the Akita, lower than the other breeds. Less than 10% of Akitas were reported to have separation anxiety, the lowest amount. 70% of all human directed aggression involved a visitor on the Akita's territory, highlighting the defensive nature of the breed.

A Japanese study found that the CAG repeat polymorphism in the AR gene in the Akita Inu was correlated with increased reports of aggression in male Akita dogs, but not females.

== Health ==
=== Autoimmune diseases ===
Many autoimmune diseases are known to occur in the Akita, including:

- Vogt–Koyanagi–Harada syndrome, also known as uveo-dermatologic syndrome, is an autoimmune condition that affects the skin and eyes.
- Autoimmune hemolytic anemia is an autoimmune blood disorder.
- Sebaceous adenitis is an autoimmune skin disorder believed to be of autosomal recessive inheritance.
- Pemphigus foliaceus is an autoimmune skin disorder, believed to be genetic.
- Systemic lupus erythematosus, or lupus, is a systemic autoimmune connective-tissue disease that can affect any part of the body.

=== Immune-mediated endocrine diseases ===
In addition to these, some immune-mediated endocrine diseases with a heritable factor can occur, such as:

- Hypoadrenocorticism, also known as Addison's disease, affects the adrenal glands and is essentially the opposite of Cushing's syndrome.
- Diabetes mellitus, also known as type 1 diabetes, affects the pancreas.
- Hypothyroidism, also known as autoimmune hypothyroidism, is an autoimmune disease that affects the thyroid gland.

=== Nonimmune-specific conditions ===
Other nonimmune-specific conditions known to have occurred in the Akita include:

- Gastric dilation, also known as bloat may progress to gastric dilatation volvulus, in which the stomach twists on itself.
- Microphthalmia, meaning "small eyes", is a developmental disorder of the eye, believed to be an autosomal recessive genetic condition.
- Primary glaucoma, results increased pressure within the eyeball.
- Progressive retinal atrophy is a progressive degeneration of the retina (portion of the eye that senses light and allows sight).
- Hip dysplasia is a skeletal condition where the head of the femur does not fit properly into the hip socket it leads to osteoarthritis and pain.
- Elbow dysplasia is a skeletal condition in which the components of the elbow joint (the humerus, radius, and ulna) do not line up properly, leading to osteoarthritis and pain.
- Von Willebrand disease, is a genetic bleeding disorder caused by a deficiency in Von Willebrand factor.
- Cushing's syndrome, also known as hyperadrenocorticism, affects the adrenal glands, and is caused by long-term exposure to high levels of glucocorticosteroids, either manufactured by the body or given as medications.

=== Breed-specific conditions ===
These breed-specific conditions are mentioned in veterinary literature:

- Immune sensitivity to vaccines, drugs, insecticides, anesthetics, and tranquilizers
- Pseudohyperkalemia is a rise in the level of potassium that occurs due to its excessive leakage from red blood cells (RBCs) when blood is drawn. This can give a false indication of hyperkalemia on lab tests, hence the prefix pseudo, meaning false. This occurs because many East Asian breeds, including Akitas and Shiba Inus, have a higher level of potassium in their RBCs than other dogs.

=== Life expectancy ===
A UK study found a life expectancy of 11.4 years for the breed compared to an average of 12.7 for purebreeds and 12 for crossbreeds.

== Working life ==
Predecessors of the modern Akita were used for hunting bear, wild boar, and deer in Japan as late as 1957. They would be used to flush out the boar and keep it at bay until the hunter could come and kill it. Today, the breed is used primarily as a companion dog, but is currently also known to be used as therapy dogs, and compete in all dog competitions, including conformation showing, obedience trials, canine good-citizen program, tracking trials, and agility competition, as well as weight pulling, hunting, and Schutzhunde (personal protection dogs).

== Akita Inu Preservation Society ==
The Akita Inu Hozonkai (AKIHO; Akita Inu Preservation Society) is a public interest incorporated association whose purpose is to protect and breed the Akita Inu. In the late Meiji period, the dog-fighting craze grew, and the trend to breed stronger dogs became stronger. In this time, pure Akita Inu were on the verge of extinction due to crossbreeding with other dog breeds such as the Tosa. Akita Inu Hozonkai was founded in 1927, and in 1954 it was merged with the Akita Dog Preservation Association to form the current organization.

The Akita Inu Hozonkai was established in May 1927 by Izumi Shigeie, who was the mayor of Odate Town in Kitaakita District, Akita Prefecture at the time. In 1931, the Akita Inu became the first domestic dog breed to be designated as a natural monument, and around 1934, dog registration began. In 1938, the Akita Inu standard was established. In 1936, the Akita Inu Preservation Association was established as a prefecture-wide organization, with Akita Prefecture Governor Masasuke Kodama as its chairman.

During the Pacific War, the bloodline was continued by crossbreeding with shepherds, the only dogs approved for military use in Japan, but the breed regressed significantly from the Akita lineage that had been preserved. After the war, efforts to restore the lineage were resumed using the few remaining Akitas. The Akita Inu Preservation Society resumed exhibitions in 1947, and began publishing its newsletter, the "Akita Inu," in 1949.

Akita Inu Hozonkai transitioned to an incorporated association in May 1953. In 1954, the Akita Inu Preservation Society and the Akita Inu Preservation Association were merged to form the current organization. Since then, the organization has expanded its branches nationwide and even established branches overseas. In May 2015, it transitioned to a public interest incorporated association.

== See also ==
- List of dog breeds
- Ginga: Nagareboshi Gin
- Hachikō
- Rōken Shrine
- Iwate Inu
- Kai Ken
- Kishu
- Lovely Muco
- Shikoku (dog)
- Tsugaru Inu
