= Sebaceous adenitis =

Skin disease

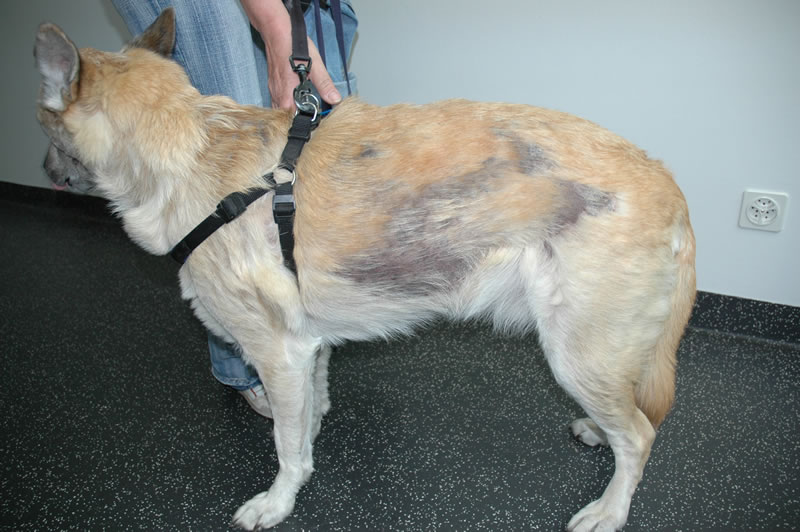
Sebaceous adenitis and hair loss in a dog

Sebaceous adenitis is an uncommon skin disease found in some breeds of dog, and more rarely in cats, rabbits and horses. characterised by an inflammatory response against the dog's sebaceous glands (glands found in the hair follicles in the skin dermis), which can lead to the destruction of the gland. It was first described in veterinary literature in the 1980s.

== Signs ==
There are two expressions of this condition, one for long- or double-coated breeds and one for short-coated breeds, both with differing presentations.

- For long- or double-coated breeds such as Poodles, Akitas and Samoyeds, the condition often presents itself with silvery dandruff which adheres to the coat, hair loss (not to be confused with moulting or "blowing coat"), a dull and brittle coat, and later on skin lesions along the back and ears as well as thickened skin and a musty or rancid odour.
- For short-coated breeds such as Vizslas, the condition causes facial swellings, nodular skin lesions, fine dandruff which does not adhere to the coat, and a general "moth-eaten" appearance to the coat.

== Cause ==
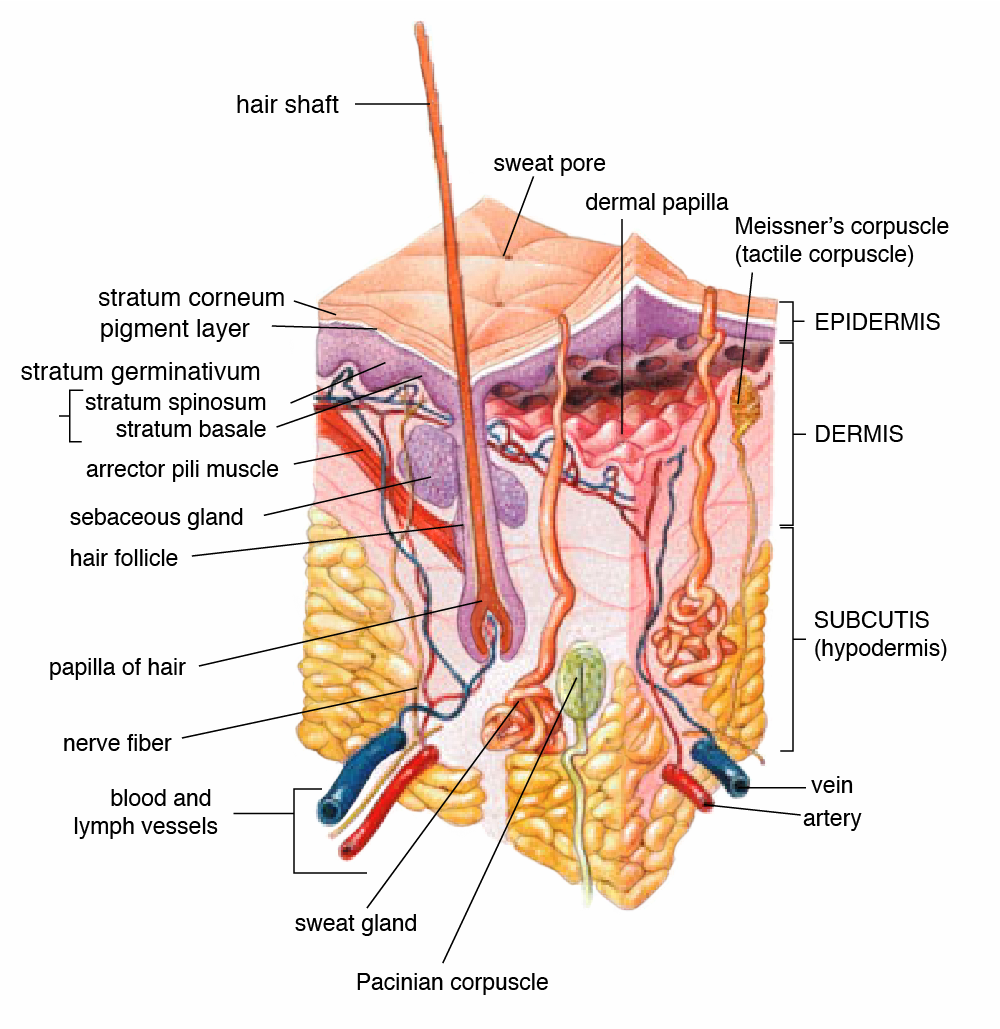
Anatomy of human skin, which shows the location of human and canine sebaceous glands

The signs of sebaceous adenitis are caused by an inflammatory disease process which affects the sebaceous glands of the skin. The cause of the inflammatory disease is unknown. Different breeds of dogs may have different underlying causes of the disease.

Research is currently underway to find if there is a genetic predisposition for sebaceous adenitis; the exact mode of inheritance remains unknown.

In Standard Poodles, sebaceous adenitis is most likely an autosomal recessive inherited disease, with variable expression.

== Diagnosis ==
In general, sebaceous adenitis is underdiagnosed in dogs. Diagnosis confirmation requires multiple punch biopsies analysed by a dermopathologist who will comment on the condition of the sebaceous glands, revealing granulomatous or pyogranulomatous inflammation surrounding the sebaceous glands or even complete destruction of sebaceous glands.

Other conditions with similar presentations include: bacterial folliculitis and demodicosis, dermatophytosis, endocrinopathy, pemphigus foliaceus, zinc responsive dermatosis, vitamin A-responsive dermatosis, ichthyosis, and nutritional deficiencies. As well as, superficial pyoderma, primary idiopathic seborrhea and other endocrine diseases.

== Treatment ==
There is no cure for this condition. Treatment is generally lifelong and takes the form of bathing and soaking in mineral oils and washing with antibiotic shampoos to try to alleviate symptoms and slow the condition's progression. Antiseptic and antibiotic shampoos (chlorhexidine or benzoyl peroxide) are used to manage further secondary bacterial infection. For some breeds, cyclosporine or corticosteroids and immunosuppressant drugs may be effective, and it is postulated, through some studies, that large doses of vitamin A given orally may result in some improvement.

It has been suggested that the more aggressively one applies the topical methods of treatment, the less aggressively one needs to employ the immunosuppressant therapy. The suggestion is that this phenomenon may be due to a cyclic feedback whereby secondary infection, when not aggressively treated with topical therapy, increases and contributes to further sebaceous gland inflammation.

=== Topical therapy ===
This forms a major and critical part in the disease treatment and the shampoo treatment can need to be applied as often as 3 to 4 times per week. An antiseborrheic shampoo removes the scale blocking the follicles. The mineral oil soak, whereby the oil remains on the affected animal for at least 2 hours, is needed to replace epidermal lipids as well as to restore normal epidermal barrier function. The oil is then removed through the process of many baths. This oil treatment needs to be repeated at least once a week for 4 to 7 weeks until new hair growth is observed. Once new hair growth is observed, topical treatment can be decreased to every 2 to 4 weeks.

=== Immunosuppressant therapy ===
Immunosuppressant and anti-inflammatory therapy serves to stop on-going destruction of the sebaceous glands. Like other inflammatory diseases, most animals receive an initial course to stop the inflammation and treatment is tapered off to the lowest dose that keeps the disease in remission. Oral cyclosporine may be used. Corticosteroids (e.g. prednisone) are used only if pruritus is a major clinical feature.

=== Dietary supplementation ===
Commonly used dietary supplements include:

- Omega-6 fatty acids (e.g., safflower or sunflower oil)
- Omega-3 fatty acids (e.g., fish oils)
- Vitamin A.

== Epidemiology ==
While the condition has been seen in over 60 breeds of dog (including cross breeds), certain breeds have been found to be more susceptible than others to sebaceous adenitis:

- American Akita and Akita Inu
- Standard Poodle
- Vizsla
- English Springer Spaniel
- Chow Chow
- Samoyed
- Weimaraner
- Havanese

Breeds also mentioned in scientific literature as having some susceptibility include:

- German Shepherd
- Dachshund
- Old English Sheepdog
- Lhasa Apso
- Boxer
- Collie
- Toy Poodle
- Mixed-breeds

Sebaceous adenitis has no sex-predisposition. Sebaceous adenitis also occurs in cats, rabbits, and horses.

== Etymology ==
Adenitis is a general term referring to inflammation of a gland. Sebaceous refers to the oil gland, which is the gland affected by this disease.
