= Havapoo =

Dog crossbreed

- Other names: Poovanese; Havadoodle; Havanese-Poodle mix
- Origin: United States (US)
- Breed status: Not recognized as a breed by any major kennel club.
Traits
- Height: 8–15 in (20–38 cm)
- Weight: 7–20 lb (3–9 kg); occasionally up to 30 lb
- Coat: Curly, wavy or silky; low-shedding
- Color: Black, white, cream, chocolate, red, apricot, sable, silver, parti-color, phantom, brindle

The Havapoo (also known as Poovanese, Havadoodle, or Havanese-Poodle mix) is a small designer dog produced by crossing a Havanese with a Poodle (usually Toy or Miniature Poodle). Developed in the United States in the late 20th and early 21st centuries, it is one of many intentional Poodle hybrids bred primarily as affectionate, low-shedding companion dogs.

The Havapoo is not recognized as a standardized breed by major kennel clubs such as the American Kennel Club (AKC), United Kennel Club (UKC), or Fédération Cynologique Internationale (FCI).

== History ==
Havapoos emerged in the United States during the 1990s and 2000s alongside other popular Poodle hybrids such as the Labradoodle and Goldendoodle. Breeders sought to combine the cheerful, people-oriented temperament of the Havanese with the intelligence and low-shedding coat of the Poodle.

== Characteristics ==
Havapoos typically stand 8–15 in (20–38 cm) at the shoulder and weigh 7–20 lb (3.2–9.1 kg), though some individuals reach up to 30 lb.

Coat types range from curly (Poodle-like) to wavy or silky (Havanese-like). Common colors include black, white, cream, chocolate, red, apricot, sable, silver, parti-color, phantom, and brindle. While often marketed as hypoallergenic, no dog is completely hypoallergenic; Havapoos generally shed very little and produce lower levels of the allergen Can f 1.

== Generations ==
- F1: 50% Havanese × 50% Poodle
- F1B: F1 Havapoo backcrossed to a Poodle (most consistently curly and low-shedding)
- Multigenerational: Havapoo × Havapoo

== Temperament ==
Havapoos are generally affectionate, playful, sociable, and intelligent. They tend to get along well with children and other pets when properly socialized and are known for adaptability to apartment living.

== Health ==
Potential inherited conditions include patellar luxation, progressive retinal atrophy, heart issues, Legg–Calvé–Perthes disease, and dental problems. Responsible breeders perform health testing on parent dogs through organizations such as the Orthopedic Foundation for Animals (OFA).

Average lifespan is 12–16 years.

== Care ==
Regular grooming (brushing several times weekly and professional grooming every 4–8 weeks) is required. Early socialization and positive-reinforcement training are recommended.
