= Attack Poodles and Other Media Mutants =

2004 book by James Wolcott

Attack Poodles and Other Media Mutants: The Looting of the News in a Time of Terror
- Author: James Wolcott
- Publication date: 2004
- ISBN: 1-4013-5212-X

Attack Poodles and Other Media Mutants: The Looting of the News in a Time of Terror (2004) is a book by American media critic James Wolcott.

== Summary ==
Wolcott takes as his subject matter popular right-wing pundits whom he dubs "attack poodles". These include such TV figures as Bill O'Reilly, Michael Savage, Chris Matthews, Dennis Miller, Rush Limbaugh, Ann Coulter, Peggy Noonan, and Robert Novak. He asserts their simplistic sloganeering which panders to disaffected Americans is destroying political discourse.

The Publishers Weekly website says that "beneath Wolcott's humor and catchy prose, however, lurk some dark revelations, such as a Fox news staffer's claim that he and his colleagues are instructed to seek out stories that "cater to angry, middle-aged white men who listen to talk-radio and yell at their televisions."

== Reception ==
The Publishers Weekly website said that the book is "intelligent, amusing and insightful," but the author's "effort is still unlikely to approach sales anywhere close to those of books published recently by some of the "attack poodles" he criticizes."

Another review said that "Wolcott's not really a writer suited to book-length. He's brilliant in article length, or blog post length, since he communicates well and invariably gets in at least one or two ripostes that would make anyone proud."
