= James Wolcott =

American journalist and cultural critic

- Born: December 10, 1952 (age 73); Baltimore, Maryland, U.S.
- Education: Frostburg State College (dropped out)
- Occupations: Journalist; critic; novelist
- Writing career
- Notable work: Attack Poodles and Other Media Mutants (2004)

James Wolcott (born December 10, 1952) is an American journalist, known for his critique of contemporary media. Wolcott was the cultural critic for Vanity Fair and has contributed to The New Yorker. He had his own blog on Vanity Fair's main site, which was awarded a Webby Award in 2007.

== Background and education ==
Wolcott was born in Baltimore, Maryland, and raised in a suburban setting. He attended Maryland's Frostburg State College for two years. From there, he moved to New York City, to work at The Village Voice, first in the circulation department answering phone complaints, then as a receptionist. He is married to Laura Jacobs, a contributing editor at Vanity Fair. He began practicing the Transcendental Meditation technique in 2007.

== Career ==
Since arriving in New York, Wolcott has been a columnist on media and pop culture for such publications as Esquire, Harper's Magazine, The New Yorker, The New York Review of Books and New York. He was taken on at Vanity Fair by Leo Lerman, then the magazine's editor.

Wolcott's novel, The Catsitters, was published in 2001. In 2004, he published Attack Poodles and Other Media Mutants, a critique of right-wing media in the United States.

His memoir Lucking Out: My Life Getting Down and Semi-Dirty in Seventies New York was published on October 25, 2011.

== Awards and honors ==
- 2014 PEN/Diamonstein-Spielvogel Award for the Art of the Essay for Critical Mass

== Bibliography ==
=== Fiction ===
- Wolcott, James (2001). The Catsitters: A Novel. New York: HarperCollins.

=== Non-fiction ===
- Wolcott, James (2004). Attack Poodles, and Other Media Mutants: The Looting of the News in a Time of Terror. New York: Miramax Books.
- Lucking Out: My Life Getting Down and Semi-Dirty in Seventies New York
- Critical Mass: Four Decades of Essays, Reviews, Hand Grenades, and Hurrahs
- — (December 2012). "Dry, with a twist". Spotlight. Vanity Fair. Vol. 628. pp. 169–171.
- — (June 2013). "Andrew Breitbart's Circus Maximus". Vanity Fair. Vol. 634. pp. 52–53.
- "Sisyphus at the Selectric" (review of Blake Bailey, Philip Roth: The Biography, Cape, April 2021, 898 pp., ISBN 978 0 224 09817 5; Ira Nadel, Philip Roth: A Counterlife, Oxford, May 2021, 546 pp., ISBN 978 0 19 984610 8; and Benjamin Taylor, Here We Are: My Friendship with Philip Roth, Penguin, May 2020, 192 pp., ISBN 978 0 525 50524 2), London Review of Books, vol. 43, no. 10 (20 May 2021), pp. 3, 5–10. Wolcott: "He's a great writer but is he a great writer? And what does 'great writer' mean now anyhow?" (p. 10.)
