= Rōken Shrine =

Shinto shrine in Akita Prefecture, Japan

Coordinates: 40°14′20.0″N 140°41′13.0″E

Rōken Shrine 老犬神社
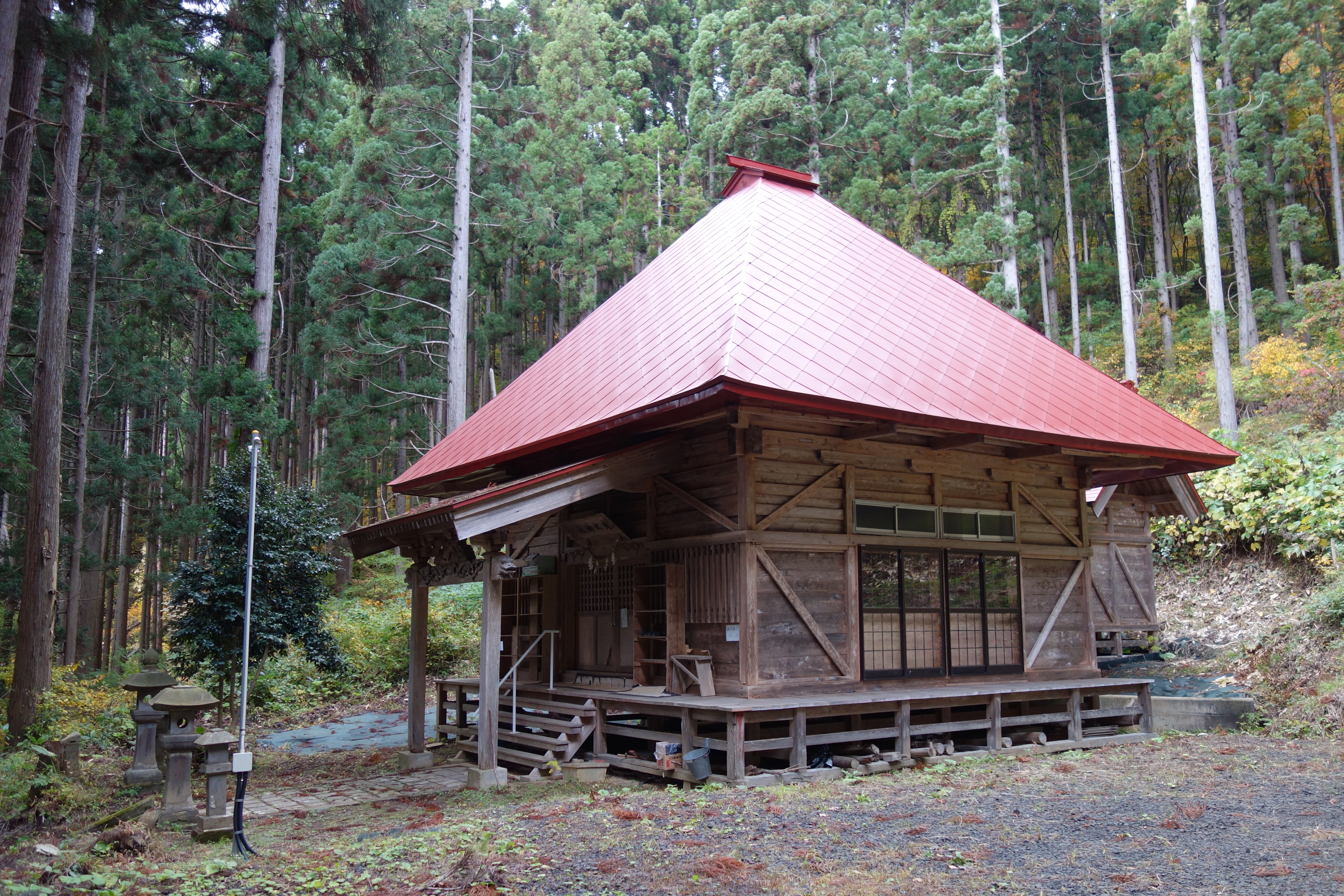

- Location within Japan

Religion
- Affiliation: Shintō
- Deity: Shiro the Dog (しろ)

Architecture
- Established: 1620; 406 years ago

Rōken Shrine (老犬神社, Rōken jinja) is a small Shintō shrine in Ōdate, Akita Prefecture, Japan dedicated to dogs.

== History ==
In 1604, Nanbu Toshinao, lord of the Nanbu Domain, gave a hunting license to a matagi named Sadaroku (左多六) from the village of Kusaki (草木) in recognition of his ancestor from Ninohe who had participated in the Fuji no Makigari during the summer of 1193. Sadaroku had a very large female dog named Shiro (しろ; lit. 'white') for her white fur.

According to legend, Sadaroku was later decapitated at Sannohe Castle for poaching under tragic circumstances after he had forgotten to carry his hunting license with him. Shiro ran all the way back to Kusaki village over Raiman Pass to retrieve Sadaroku's hunting license so that he could prove his innocence, but did not return in time. Thereafter, the castle was plagued with bad luck and soon was partially destroyed by a fire. For a long while Shiro could be heard howling in the forest at night.

Sadaroku's wife and Shiro were banished from the Nanbu Domain for being relatives of a criminal, and the two moved to Kuzowara (葛原) village in the neighboring Akita Domain. When Shiro died in Kuzowara, the villagers buried her in a small tumulus. Horses would panic if led near the grave, and eventually the villagers became so frightened by it that the land around the site was deserted. In 1620 the grave was moved about 50 meters to its current location where Rōken Shrine was established to propitiate Shiro's spirit.

At the beginning of the 19th century, Rōken Shrine was visited by the wandering scholar Sugae Masumi. In the Meiji period, burglars stole Sadaroku's hunting license from the shrine's treasure box. The villagers were eventually able to recover it after much expense and effort. In 1936, the shrine burned down but the treasure box was rescued and the building was later rebuilt.

In 2020, to commemorate the 400th anniversary of the shrine, the city of Ōdate unveiled a stone statue of Shiro.

== See also ==
- Inuboemori, "Howling Dog Woods"
- Hachikō, born near Ōdate
